Miscegenation is the interbreeding of people who are considered to be members of different races. The word, now usually considered pejorative, is derived from a combination of the Latin terms miscere ("to mix") and genus ("race") from the Hellenic γένος. The word first appeared in Miscegenation: The Theory of the Blending of the Races, Applied to the American White Man and Negro, a pretended anti-abolitionist pamphlet David Goodman Croly and others published anonymously in advance of the 1864 U.S. presidential election. The term came to be associated with laws that banned interracial marriage and sex, which were known as anti-miscegenation laws.

Opposition to miscegenation, framed as preserving so-called racial purity, is a typical theme of racial supremacist movements. Although the notion that racial mixing is undesirable has arisen at different points in history, it gained particular prominence among white communities in United States during the colonial period.

Although the term "miscegenation" was formed from the Latin miscere "to mix" plus genus "race" or "kind", and it could therefore be perceived as being value-neutral, it is almost always a pejorative term which is used by people who believe in racial superiority or purity. Less loaded terms for multiethnic relationships, such as interethnic or interracial marriages, and mixed-race, multiethnic, or multiracial people, are more common in contemporary usage.

Usage
In the present day, the use of the word miscegenation is avoided by many scholars, because the term suggests that race is a concrete biological phenomenon, rather than a categorization which is imposed on certain relationships. The term's historical usage in contexts which typically implied disapproval is also a reason why more unambiguously neutral terms such as interracial, interethnic or cross-cultural are more common in contemporary usage. The term remains in use among scholars when referring to past practices concerning multiraciality, such as anti-miscegenation laws that banned interracial marriages.

In Spanish, Portuguese, and French, the words used to describe the mixing of races are mestizaje, mestiçagem and métissage. These words, much older than the term miscegenation, are derived from the Late Latin mixticius for "mixed", which is also the root of the Spanish word mestizo. (Portuguese also uses miscigenação, derived from the same Latin root as the English word.) These non-English terms for "race-mixing" are not considered as offensive as "miscegenation", although they have historically been tied to the caste system (casta) that was established during the colonial era in Spanish-speaking Latin America.

Today, the mixes among races and ethnicities are diverse, so it is considered preferable to use the term "mixed-race" or simply "mixed" (mezcla). In Portuguese-speaking Latin America (i.e., Brazil), a milder form of caste system existed, although it also provided for legal and social discrimination among individuals belonging to different races, since slavery for black people existed until the late 19th century. Intermarriage occurred significantly from the very first settlements, with their descendants achieving high rank in government and society. To this day, there are controversies if Brazilian class system would be drawn mostly around socio-economic lines, not racial ones (in a manner similar to other former Portuguese colonies). Conversely, people classified in censuses as black, brown ("pardo") or indigenous have disadvantaged social indicators in comparison to the white population.

The concept of miscegenation is tied to concepts of racial difference. As the different connotations and etymologies of miscegenation and mestizaje suggest, definitions of race, "race mixing" and multiraciality have diverged globally as well as historically, depending on changing social circumstances and cultural perceptions. Mestizo are people of mixed white and indigenous, usually Amerindian ancestry, who do not self-identify as indigenous peoples or Native Americans. In Canada, however, the Métis, who also have partly Amerindian and partly white, often French-Canadian, ancestry, have identified as an ethnic group and are a constitutionally recognized aboriginal people.

Interracial marriages are often disparaged in racial minority communities as well. Data from the Pew Research Center has shown that African Americans are twice as likely as white Americans to believe that interracial marriage "is a bad thing". There is a considerable amount of scientific literature that demonstrates similar patterns. However, most of the scientific research that is conducted on public attitudes towards miscegenation is almost exclusively interested in white people's attitudes on the matter; very little of the research is focused on the attitudes that non-white ethnic groups have towards miscegenation.

The differences between related terms and words which encompass aspects of racial admixture show the impact of different historical and cultural factors leading to changing social interpretations of race and ethnicity. Thus the Comte de Montlosier, in exile during the French Revolution, the equated class difference in 18th-century France with racial difference. Borrowing Boulainvilliers' discourse on the "Nordic race" as being the French aristocracy that invaded the plebeian "Gauls", he showed his contempt for the lowest social class, the Third Estate, calling it "this new person born of slaves ... a mixture of all races and of all times".

Etymological history

Miscegenation comes from the Latin miscere, "to mix" and genus, "kind". The word was coined in the U.S. in 1863 in an anonymous hoax pamphlet, and the etymology of the word is tied up with political conflicts during the American Civil War over the abolition of slavery and over the racial segregation of African-Americans. The reference to genus was made to emphasize the supposedly distinct biological differences between whites and non-whites, though all humans belong to the same genus, Homo, and the same species, Homo sapiens.

The word was coined in an anonymous propaganda pamphlet published in New York City in December 1863, during the American Civil War. The pamphlet was entitled Miscegenation: The Theory of the Blending of the Races, Applied to the American White Man and Negro.
It purported to advocate the intermarriage of whites and blacks until they were indistinguishably mixed, as desirable, and further asserted that this was a goal of the Republican Party. The pamphlet was a hoax, concocted by Democrats to discredit the Republicans by imputing to them what were then radical views that would offend the vast majority of whites, even those who opposed slavery. The issue of miscegenation, raised by the opponents of Abraham Lincoln, featured prominently in the election campaign of 1864. In his fourth debate with Stephen A. Douglas, Lincoln took great care to emphasise that he supported the law of Illinois which forbade "the marrying of white people with negroes".

The pamphlet and variations on it were reprinted widely in both the North and South by Democrats and Confederates. Only in November 1864, after Lincoln had won the election, was the pamphlet exposed in the United States as a hoax.  It was written by David Goodman Croly, managing editor of the New York World, a Democratic Party paper, and George Wakeman, a World reporter.  By then, the word miscegenation had entered the common language of the day as a popular buzzword in political and social discourse.

Before the publication of Miscegenation, the terms racial intermixing and amalgamation, the latter borrowed from metallurgy, were used as a general terms for ethnic and racial genetic mixing. Contemporary usage of the amalgamation metaphor was that of Ralph Waldo Emerson's private vision in 1845 of America as an ethnic and racial smelting-pot, a variation on the concept of the melting pot. Opinions in the U.S on the desirability of such intermixing, including that between white Protestants and Irish Catholic immigrants, were divided. The term miscegenation was coined to refer specifically to the intermarriage of blacks and whites, with the intent of galvanizing opposition to the war.

In Spanish America, the term mestizaje, which is derived from mestizo, is a term used to describe a person who is the offspring of an indigenous American and a European.  The primary reason why there are so few indigenous peoples of Central and South America remaining is because of the persistent and pervasive miscegenation between the Iberian colonists and the indigenous American population, which is the most common admixture of ethnicities found in the genetic tests of present-day Latinos. This explains why Latinos in North America, the vast majority of whom are immigrants or descendants of immigrants from Central and South America, carry an average of 18% Native American ancestry, and 65.1% European ancestry (mostly from the Iberian Peninsula).

Laws banning miscegenation

Laws banning "race-mixing" were enforced in certain U.S. states until 1967 (but they were still on the books in some states until 2000), in Nazi Germany (the Nuremberg Laws) from 1935 until 1945, and in South Africa during the apartheid era (1949–1985). All of these laws primarily banned marriage between persons who were members of different racially or ethnically defined groups, which was termed "amalgamation" or "miscegenation" in the U.S. The laws in Nazi Germany and the laws in many U.S. states, as well as the laws in South Africa, also banned sexual relations between such individuals.

In the United States, various state laws prohibited marriages between whites and blacks, and in many states, they also prohibited marriages between whites and Native Americans as well as marriages between whites and Asians. In the U.S., such laws were known as anti-miscegenation laws. From 1913 until 1948, 30 out of the then 48 states enforced such laws. Although an "Anti-Miscegenation Amendment" to the United States Constitution was proposed in 1871, in 1912–1913, and again in 1928, no nationwide law against racially mixed marriages was ever enacted. In 1967, the United States Supreme Court unanimously ruled in Loving v. Virginia that anti-miscegenation laws are unconstitutional. With this ruling, these laws were no longer in effect in the remaining 16 states which still had them.

The Nazi ban on interracial sexual relations and marriages was enacted in September 1935 as part of the Nuremberg Laws, the Gesetz zum Schutze des deutschen Blutes und der deutschen Ehre (The Law for the Protection of German Blood and German Honour). The Nuremberg Laws classified Jews as a race, and they also forbade extramarital sexual relations and marriages between persons who were classified as "Aryans" and persons who were classified as "non-Aryans". Violations of these laws were condemned as Rassenschande (lit. "race-disgrace/race-shame") and they could be punished by imprisonment (usually followed by deportation to a concentration camp) and they could even be punished by death.

The Prohibition of Mixed Marriages Act in South Africa, enacted in 1949, banned intermarriages between members of different racial groups, including intermarriages between whites and non-whites. The Immorality Act, enacted in 1950, also made it a criminal offense for a white person to have any sexual relations with a person who was a member of a different race. Both of these laws were repealed in 1985.

History of ethnoracial admixture and attitudes towards miscegenation

Africa
Africa has had a long history of mixing with non-Africans since prehistoric times. The Eurasian Backflow which happened in prehistoric times saw a huge migration from the Levant entering the region and these migrants mixing with the native Africans. Signs of this migration can be found among the people inhabiting the Horn of Africa and Sudan. Africa in antiquity, also has had long history of interracial mixing with male Arab and European explorers, traders and soldiers having sexual relations with black African women as well as taking them as wives.

Sir Richard Francis Burton writes, during his expedition to Africa, about relationships between black women and white men: "The women are well disposed toward strangers of fair complexion, apparently with the permission of their husbands." There are several mixed race populations throughout Africa mostly the results of interracial relationships between Arab and European men and black women. In South Africa, there are big mixed race communities like the Coloureds and Griqua formed by White colonists taking native African wives. In Namibia there is a community called the Rehoboth Basters formed by the interracial marriage of Dutch/German men and black African women.

In the former Portuguese Africa (now known as Angola, Mozambique and Cape Verde) racial mixing between white Portuguese and black Africans was fairly common, especially in Cape Verde where the majority of the population is of mixed descent.

There have been some recorded cases of Chinese merchants and labourers taking African wives throughout Africa as many Chinese workers were employed to build railways and other infrastructural projects in Africa. These labour groups were made up completely of men with very few Chinese women coming to Africa.

In West Africa, especially Nigeria there are many cases of non-African men taking African women. Many of their offspring have gained prominent positions in Africa. Flight Lieutenant Jerry John Rawlings, who had a Scottish father and a black Ghanaian mother became the president of Ghana. Jean Ping, the son of a Chinese trader and a black Gabonese mother, became the deputy prime minister as well as the foreign minister of Gabon and was the Chairperson of the Commission of the African Union from 2009 to 2012. The president of Botswana, Ian Khama, is the son of Botswana's first president, Seretse Khama, and a white British student, Ruth Williams Khama. Nicolas Grunitzky, who was the son of a white German father and a Togolese mother, became the second president of Togo after a coup.

Indian men, who have long been traders in East Africa, sometimes married among local African women. The British Empire brought many Indian workers into East Africa to build the Uganda Railway. Indians eventually populated South Africa, Kenya, Uganda, Tanzania, Malawi, Rwanda, Zambia, Zimbabwe and Zaire in small numbers. These interracial unions were mostly unilateral marriages between Indian men and East African women.

Mauritius
In the late 19th to early 20th century, Chinese men in Mauritius married local Indian and Creole women due to both the lack of Chinese women, and the higher numbers of Indian women on the island. When the very first Chinese men arrived in Mauritius, they were reluctant to marry local women due to their customary endogamy rules. But with no Chinese women in sight, the Chinese men eventually began to integrate themselves and mix with the local Creole and Indian populations on the island and establish households en ménage. The 1921 census in Mauritius counted that Indian women there had a total of 148 children fathered by Chinese men. These Chinese were mostly traders.

Congo
During the 1970s, an increased demand for copper and cobalt attracted Japanese investments in the mineral-rich southeastern region of Katanga Province. Over a 10-year period, more than 1,000 Japanese miners relocated to the region, confined to a strictly male-only camp. Arriving without family or spouses, the men often sought social interaction outside the confines of their camps. In search of intimacy with the opposite sex, resulting in cohabitation, the men openly engaged in interracial dating and relationships, a practice embraced by the local society. As a result, a number of Japanese miners fathered children with Native Congolese women. However, most of the mixed race infants resulting from these unions died, soon after birth. Multiple testimonies of local people suggest that the infants were poisoned by a Japanese lead physician and nurse working at the local mining hospital. Subsequently, the circumstances would have brought the miners shame as most of them already had families back in their native Japan. The practice forced many native Katangan mothers to hide their children by not reporting to the hospital to give birth.

Today, fifty Afro-Japanese have formed an association of Katanga Infanticide survivors. The organization has hired legal counsel seeking a formal investigation into the killings. The group submitted an official inquiry to both the Congolese and Japanese governments, to no avail. Issues specific to this group include having no documentation of their births since not having been born in the local hospital spared their lives. The total number of survivors is unknown.

Réunion

The majority of the population of Réunion is defined as mixed race. In the last 350 years, various ethnic groups (Africans, Chinese, English, French, Gujarati Indians, Tamil Indians) have arrived and settled on the island. There have been mixed race people on the island since its first permanent inhabitation in 1665.
The Native Kaf population has a diverse range of ancestry stemming from colonial Indian and Chinese peoples. They also descend from African slaves brought from countries like Mozambique, Guinea, Senegal, Madagascar, Tanzania and Zambia to the island.

Most population of Réunion Creoles who are of mixed ancestry and make up the majority of the population. Mixed unions between European men and Chinese men with African women, Indian women, Chinese women, Madagascar women were also common.  In 2005, a genetic study on the racially mixed people of Réunion found the following.  For maternal (mitochondrial) DNA, the haplogroups are Indian (44%), East Asian (27%), European/Middle Eastern (19%) or African (10%). The Indian lineages are M2, M6 and U2i, the East Asian ones are E1, D5a, M7c, and F (E1 and M7c also found only in South East Asia and in Madagascar), the European/Middle Eastern ones are U2e, T1, J, H, and I, and the African ones are L1b1, L2a1, L3b, and L3e1.

For paternal (Y-chromosome) DNA, the haplogroups are European/Middle Eastern (85%) or East Asian (15%). The European lineages are R1b and I, the Middle Eastern one E1b1b1c (formerly E3b3) (also found in Northeast Africa), and the East Asian ones are R1a (found in many parts of the world including Europe and Central and Southern Asia but the particular sequence has been found in Asia) and O3.

Madagascar
There was frequent intermixing between the Austronesian and Bantu-speaking populations of Madagascar. A large number of the Malagasy today are the result of admixture between Austronesians and Africans. This is most evident in the Mikea, who are also the last known Malagasy population to still practice a hunter-gatherer lifestyle. In the study of "The Dual Origin of the Malagasy in Island Southeast Asia and East Africa: Evidence from Maternal and Paternal Lineages" shows the Bantu maternal origin to be 38% and Paternal 51% while the Southeast Asian paternal to be 34% and maternal 62%. In the study of Malagasy, autosomal DNA shows the highlanders ethnic group like Merina are almost an even mixture of Southeast Asian and Bantu origin, while the coastal ethnic group have much higher Bantu mixture in their autosomal DNA suggesting they are mixture of new Bantu migrants and the already established highlander ethnic group. Maximum-likelihood estimates favour a scenario in which Madagascar was settled approximately 1200 years ago by a very small group of women of approximately 30. The Malagasy people existed through intermarriages between the small founding population.

Intermarriage between Chinese men and native Malagasy women was not uncommon. Several thousand Cantonese men intermarried and cohabited with Malagasy women. 98% of the Chinese traced their origin from Guangdong – more specifically, the Cantonese district of Shunde. For example, the 1954 census found 1,111 "irregular" Chinese-Malagasy unions and 125 legitimate, i.e., legally married. Children were registered by their mothers under a Malagasy name. Intermarriage between French men and Native Malagasy women was not uncommon either.

Uganda
The topic of mixed race Ugandans continues to resurface, in the public arena, with the growing number of multiracial Ugandans (Multiracial Ugandans in Uganda).

North America

Canada
Canada had no explicit laws against mixed marriage, but anti-miscegenation was often enforced through different laws and upheld by the Supreme Court of Canada as valid. Velma Demerson, for example, was imprisoned in 1939 for carrying the child of a Chinese father; she was deemed "incorrigible" under the Female Refuges Act, and was physically experimented on in prison to discover the causes of her behaviour.

Ultimately, an informal and extra-legal regime ensured that the social taboo of racial intermixing was kept to a minimum (Walker, 1997; Backhouse, 1999; Walker, 2000). And, from 1855 until the 1960s, Canada chose its immigrants on the basis of their racial categorization rather than the individual merits of the applicant, with preference being given to immigrants of Northern European (especially British, Scandinavian and French) origin over the so-called "black and Asiatic races", and at times over central and southern European races.

It is arguable that Canada's various manifestations of the federal Indian Act were designed to regulate interracial (in this circumstance, Aboriginal and non- Aboriginal) marital relations and the categorization of mixed-race offspring.

The Canadian Ku Klux Klan burned crosses at a gathering in Moose Jaw, Saskatchewan, to discourage mixed marriages, and in 1930 were enlisted in Oakville, Ontario, to intimidate Isabella Jones and Ira Junius Johnson out of marrying.

United States

The historical taboo surrounding white–black relationships among American whites can be seen as a historical consequence of the oppression and racial segregation of African Americans. In many U.S. states, interracial marriage was already illegal when the term miscegenation was coined in 1863. (Before that, it was called "amalgamation".) The first laws banning interracial marriage were introduced in the late 17th century in the slave-holding colonies of Virginia (1691) and Maryland (1692). Later these laws also spread to colonies and states where slavery did not exist.

Although vehemently opposed to miscegenation in public, Thomas Jefferson fathered his slave Sally Hemings child. Regarding blacks as "inferior to the whites in the endowments of both body and mind", Jefferson, in his Notes on the State of Virginia published in 1785, would also write: "The improvement of the blacks in body and mind, in the first instance of their mixture with the whites, has been observed by every one, and proves that their inferiority is not the effect merely of their condition of life".

In the early nineteenth century, the Quaker planter Zephaniah Kingsley published a pamphlet, which defended miscegenation, the pamphlet was reprinted three times. According to him, mixed-race children are healthier and more beautiful. He also claimed to be married to a slave who he bought in Cuba at the age of 13, though the marriage did not take place in the United States, and there is no evidence of it other than Kingsley's statement. He was eventually forced to leave the United States and move to the Mayorasgo de Koka plantation in Haiti (now Dominican Republic).

In 1918, there was considerable controversy in Arizona when an Asian-Indian farmer B. K. Singh married the sixteen-year-old daughter of one of his white tenants.
During and after slavery, most American whites regarded interracial marriage between whites and blacks as taboo. However, during slavery, many white American men and women did conceive children with black partners. Some children were freed by their slave-holding fathers or bought to be emancipated if the father was not the owner. Most mixed-raced descendants merged into the African-American ethnic group during the Jim Crow era.

Initially, Filipino Americans were considered white and were not barred from interracial marriage, with documented instances of interracial marriage of Filipino men and White women in Louisiana and Washington, D.C. However, by the late 19th century and early 20th century in California, Filipinos were barred from marrying white women through a series of court cases that redefined their racial interpretation under the law. During World War II, Filipino servicemen in California had to travel with their White fiancees to New Mexico, to be able to marry.

After the Civil War and the abolition of slavery in 1865, the marriage of white and black Americans continued to be taboo, particularly in the former slave states.

The Motion Picture Production Code of 1930, also known as Hays Code, explicitly stated that the depiction of "miscegenation ... is forbidden".
One important strategy intended to discourage the marriage of white Americans and Americans of partly African descent was the promulgation of the one-drop theory, which held that any person with any known African ancestry, however remote, must be regarded as black. This definition of blackness was encoded in the anti-miscegenation laws of various U.S. states, such as Virginia's Racial Integrity Act of 1924. The plaintiffs in Loving v. Virginia, Mildred Jeter and Richard Loving became the historically most prominent interracial couple in the US through their legal struggle against this act.

Throughout American history, there has been frequent mixing between Native Americans and black Africans. When Native Americans invaded the European colony of Jamestown, Virginia in 1622, they killed the Europeans but took the African slaves as captives, gradually integrating them. Interracial relationships occurred between African Americans and members of other tribes along coastal states. During the transitional period of Africans becoming the primary race enslaved, Native Americans were sometimes enslaved with them. Africans and Native Americans worked together, some even intermarried and had mixed children. The relationship between Africans and Native-Americans was seen as a threat to Europeans and European-Americans, who actively tried to divide Native-Americans and Africans and put them against each other.

During the 18th Century, some Native American women turned to freed or runaway African men due to a major decline in the male population in Native American villages. At the same time, the early slave population in America was disproportionately male. Records show that some Native American women bought African men as slaves. Unknown to European sellers, the women freed and married the men into their tribe. Some African men chose Native American women as their partners because their children would be free, as the child's status followed that of the mother. The men could marry into some of the matrilineal tribes and be accepted, as their children were still considered to belong to the mother's people. As European expansion increased in the Southeast, African and Native American marriages became more numerous.

From the mid 19th to the mid 20th century, many black people and ethnic Mexicans intermarried with each other in the Lower Rio Grande Valley in South Texas (mostly in Cameron County and Hidalgo County). In Cameron County, 38% of black people were interracially married (7/18 families) while in Hidalgo County the number was 72% (18/25 families). These two counties had the highest rates of interracial marriages involving at least one black spouse in the United States. The vast majority of these marriages involved black men marrying ethnic Mexican women or first generation Tejanas (Texas-born women of Mexican descent). Since ethnic Mexicans were considered white by Texas officials and the U.S. government, such marriages were a violation of the state's anti-miscegenation laws. Yet, there is no evidence that anyone in South Texas was prosecuted for violating this law. The rates of this interracial marriage dynamic can be traced back to when black men moved into the Lower Rio Grande Valley after the Civil War ended. They married into ethnic Mexican families and joined other black people who found sanctuary on the U.S./Mexico border.

From the mid 19th century to the 20th century, the several hundred thousand Chinese men who migrated were almost entirely of Cantonese origin, mostly from Taishan. Anti-miscegenation laws prohibited Chinese men from marrying white women in many states. After the Emancipation Proclamation, many intermarriages in some states were not recorded and historically, Chinese American men married African American women in proportions that were higher than their total marriage numbers due to the fact that few Chinese American women lived in the United States. After the Emancipation Proclamation, many Chinese Americans migrated to the Southern United States, particularly to Arkansas, to work on plantations. For example, in 1880, the tenth US Census of Louisiana alone noted 57% of all interracial marriages were between Chinese men and black women and 43% of them were between Chinese men and white women. Between 20 and 30 percent of the Chinese who lived in Mississippi married black women before 1940. In a genetic study of 199 samples from African American males found one belong to haplogroup O2a ( or 0.5% ) It was discovered by historian Henry Louis Gates, Jr in the African American Lives documentary miniseries that NASA astronaut Mae Jemison has a significant (above 10%) genetic East Asian admixture. Gates speculated that the intermarriage/relations between migrant Chinese workers and black, or African-American slaves or ex-slaves during the 19th century might have contributed to her ethnic and genetic make-up.
In the mid 1850s, 70 to 150 Chinese were living in New York City and 11 of them married Irish women. In 1906 the New York Times (6 August) reported that 300 white women (Irish American) were married to Chinese men in New York, with many more cohabiting. In 1900, based on Liang's research, of the 120,000 men in more than 20 Chinese communities in the United States, he estimated that one out of every twenty Chinese men (Cantonese) was married to a white woman. In the 1960s census showed 3500 Chinese men married to white women and 2900 Chinese women married to white men.

Before the Civil War, accusations of support for miscegenation were commonly made against Abolitionists by defenders of slavery. After the war, similar charges were made against advocates of equal rights for African Americans by white segregationists. According to these accusations, they were said to be secretly plotting the destruction of the white race through the promotion of miscegenation. In the 1950s, segregationists alleged that a Communist plot to promote miscegenation in order to hasten the takeover of the United States was being funded by the government of the Soviet Union. In 1957, segregationists cited the anti-semitic hoax A Racial Program for the Twentieth Century as a source of evidence which proved the supposed validity of these claims.

Anti-amalgamation cartoons, such as those which were published by Edward William Clay, were "elaborately exaggerated anti-abolitionist fantasies" in which black and white people were depicted as "fraternizing and socializing on equal terms." Jerome B. Holgate's A Sojourn in the City of Amalgamation "painted a future in which sexual amalgamation was in fashion."

Bob Jones University banned interracial dating until 2000.

Asians were specifically included in the anti-miscegenation laws of some states. California continued to ban Asian/white marriages until the Perez v. Sharp decision in 1948.

In the United States, segregationists, including modern-day Christian Identity groups, have claimed that several passages in the Bible, such as the stories of Phinehas (see Phineas Priesthood), the Curse and mark of Cain, and the curse of Ham, should be understood as referring to miscegenation and they also believe that certain verses in the Bible expressly forbid it.

Interracial marriage has gained more acceptance in the United States since the civil rights movement. Approval of mixed marriages in national opinion polls has risen from 4% in 1958, 20% in 1968 (at the time of the SCOTUS decision), 36% in 1978, to 48% in 1991, 65% in 2002, 77% in 2007, and 86% in 2011. The most notable American of mixed race is the former President of the United States, Barack Obama, who is the product of a mixed marriage between a black father and a white mother. Nevertheless, as late as 2009, a Louisiana justice of the peace refused to issue a marriage license to an interracial couple, justifying the decision on grounds of concern for any future children which the couple might have.

Hawaii
The majority of Hawaiian Chinese were Cantonese-speaking migrants from Guangdong but a minority of them were Hakka. If all people with Chinese ancestry in Hawaii (including the Chinese-Hawaiians) are included, they form about 1/3 of Hawaii's entire population. A large percentage of Chinese immigrants married native-Hawaiian, European, and multi-racial Hawaiians. Intermarriage started to decline in the 1920s. Portuguese Hawaiians and others of European ancestry often married Chinese immigrants and their descendants. Birth records and census data from the 1930s demonstrate that children of mixed-parentage were often classified by only their father's ethnic identity, such as with 38 recorded births in between 1932 and 1933 to Portuguese-Chinese where the father was Chinese, reflecting American attitudes on racial purity. A large amount of mingling took place between the Chinese community in Hawaii, with many Chinese-Hawaiians marrying people from the Portuguese, Spanish, Hawaiian, Caucasian-Hawaiian, and other communities. Intermarrages in Hawaii were also documented between the Chinese and Puerto Rican, Portuguese, Japanese, Greek, and mixed-race individuals.

Mexico

In Mexico, the concept of mestizaje (or the cultural and racial amalgamation) is an integral part of the country's identity. While frequently seen as a mixture of the indigenous and Spanish, Mexico has had a notable admixture of indigenous and black Africans since the Colonial era. The Catholic Church never opposed interracial marriages, although individuals had to declare their racial classification in the parish marital register.

Cuba
120,000 Cantonese coolies (all males) entered Cuba under contract for 80 years. Most did not marry, but Hung Hui (1975:80) states there was a frequency of sexual activity between black women and Cantonese coolies. According to Osberg, (1965:69) the Chinese often bought slave women and freed them, expressly for marriage. In the 19th and 20th centuries, Chinese men (Cantonese) engaged in sexual activity with white and black Cuban women, resulting in many children. (For a British Caribbean model of Chinese cultural retention through procreation with black women, see Patterson, 322–31). In the 1920s an additional 30000 Cantonese and small groups of Japanese arrived. Both immigrations were exclusively male, and there was rapid mingling with white, black, and mulato populations. In the CIA World Factbook: Cuba (15 May 2008) the authors estimated 114,240 people with Chinese-Cuban ancestry and only 300 pure Chinese. In the study of genetic origin, admixture, and asymmetry in maternal and paternal human lineages in Cuba, 35 Y-chromosome SNPs were typed in the 132 male individuals of the Cuban sample. The study did not include any people with some Chinese ancestry. All the samples were white and black Cubans. 2 out of 132 male samples belong to East Asian Haplogroup O2 which is found in significant frequencies among Cantonese people.

El Salvador

In El Salvador, there was frequent intermarriage between black male slaves and Amerindian women. Many of these slaves intermarried with Amerindian women in hopes of gaining freedom (if not for themselves, then their offspring). Many mixed African and Amerindian children resulted from these unions. The Spanish tried to prevent such Afro-Amerindian unions, but the mixing of the two groups could not be prevented. Slaves continued to pursue natives with the prospect of freedom. According to Richard Price's book Maroon Societies (1979), it is documented that during the colonial period that Amerindian women would rather marry black men than Amerindian men, and that black men would rather marry Amerindian women than black women so that their children will be born free. Price quoted this from a history by H.H. Bancroft published in 1877 referring to colonial Mexico. El Salvador's African population lived under similar circumstances, and the mixing between black men and native women was common during colonial times.

Guatemala
There were many instances when black and mulatto men would intermarry with Mayan and other native women in Guatemala. These unions were more common in some regions than others. In Escuintla (called Escuintepeque at the time), the Pipil-speaking natives who lived at higher elevations tended to live away from the lowland coastal hot lands where black and mulatto men were concentrated. Yet, as black men grew in number during this period (1671–1701), a tendency developed for them to marry native women. In Zapotitlán (also known as Suchitepéquez), Spaniards were proportionately more significant than in Escuintla. Thus the smaller African population had less opportunity for endogamy and was disappearing by the early 18th Century as blacks married Mayans and mulattoes married mestizos and lower-ranking Spaniards. Finally in Guazacapán, a Pipil district that was 10% non-native, church marriages between Mayas or Pipils and free mulattoes were rare. But black men frequently married Mayan women in informal unions, which resulted in a significant population of mestizaje here and throughout the coastal region. In the Valle de las Vacas, black male slaves also intermarried with Mayan women.

Costa Rica
The Chinese in Costa Rica originated from Cantonese male migrants. Pure Chinese make up only 1% of the Costa Rican population but, according to Jacqueline M. Newman, as much as ten percent of the people in Costa Rica are Chinese, if counting the people who are Chinese, married to a Chinese, or of mixed Chinese descent. Most Chinese immigrants since then have been Cantonese, but in the last decades of the 20th century, a number of immigrants have also come from Taiwan. Many men came alone to work, married Costa Rican women, and speak Cantonese. However, the majority of the descendants of the first Chinese immigrants no longer speak Cantonese and think of themselves as full Costa Ricans. They married Tican women (who are a blend of European, Castizo, Mestizo, Indian, Black). A Tican is also a white person with a small amount of non-white blood, like Castizo. The 1989 census shows about 98% of Costa Ricans were either White, Castizo, Mestizos, with 80% being White or Castizo. Up to the 1940s men made up the vast majority of the Costa Rican Chinese community. Males made up the majority of the original Chinese community in Mexico and they married Mexican women.

Many Africans in Costa Rica also intermarried with other races. In late colonial Cartago, 33% of 182 married African males and 7% of married African females were married to a spouse of another race. The figures were even more striking in San Jose' where 55% of the 134 married African males and 35% of the 65 married African females were married to another race (mostly mestizos). In Cartago itself, two African males were enumerated with Spanish wives and three with Indian wives, while nine African females were married to Indian males. Spaniards rarely cohabited with mulatto women except in the cattle range region bordering Nicaragua to the north. There as well, two Spanish women were living with African males.

Jamaica and Haiti

In Haiti, there is a sizable percentage within the minority who are of Asian descent. Haiti is also home to Marabou peoples, a half East Indian and half African people who descent from East Indian immigrants who arrived from other Caribbean nations, such Martinique and Guadeloupe and African slave descendants. Most present-day descendants of the original Marabou are products of hypodescent and, subsequently, mostly of African in ancestry.

The country also has a sizable Japanese and Chinese Haitian population. One of the country's most notable Afro-Asians is the late painter Edouard Wah who was born to a Chinese immigrant father and Afro-Haitian mother.

When black and Indian women had children with Chinese men the children were called chaina raial in Jamaican English. The Chinese community in Jamaica was able to consolidate because an openness to marrying Indian women was present in the Chinese since Chinese women were in short supply. Women sharing was less common among Indians in Jamaica according to Verene A. Shepherd. The small number of Indian women were fought over between Indian men and led to a rise in the amount of wife murders by Indian men. Indian women made up 11 percent of the annual amount of Indian indentured migrants from 1845 to 1847 in Jamaica. Thousands of Chinese men and Indian men married local Jamaican women. The study "Y-chromosomal diversity in Haiti and Jamaica: Contrasting levels of sex-biased gene flow" shows the paternal Chinese haplogroup O-M175 at a frequency of 3.8% in local Jamaicans ( non-Chinese Jamaicans) including the Indian H-M69 (0.6%) and L-M20 (0.6%) in local Jamaicans. Among the country's most notable Afro-Asians are reggae singers Sean Paul, Tami Chynn and Diana King.

South America

Latin America and the Caribbean

About 300,000 Cantonese coolies and migrants (almost all males) migrated during 1849–1874 to Latin America; many of them intermarried and cohabited with the Black, Mestizo, and European population of Cuba, Peru, Guyana, and Trinidad.

In addition, Latin American societies also witnessed growth in both Church-sanctioned and common law marriages between Africans and the non-colored.

Argentina
In Buenos Aires in 1810, only 2.2 percent of African men and 2.5 percent of African women were married to the non-colored (white). In 1827, the figures increased to 3.0 percent for men and 6.0 percent for women. Racial mixing increased even further as more African men began enlisting in the army. Between 1810 and 1820 only 19.9% of African men were enlisted in the army. Between 1850 and 1860, this number increased to 51.1%. This led to a sexual imbalance between African men and women in Argentina. Unions between African women and non-colored men became more common in the wake of massive Italian immigration to the country. This led one African male editorial commentator to quip that, given to the sexual imbalance in the community, black women who "could not get bread would have to settle for pasta".

Bolivia

During the colonial period, many black people often intermarried with the native population (mostly Aymara). The result of these relationships was the blending between the two cultures (Aymara and Afro-Bolivian).

After Bolivia's Agrarian Reform of 1953, black people (like indigenous people) migrated from their agricultural villages to the cities of La Paz, Cochabamba, and Santa Cruz in search of better educational and employment opportunities. Related to this, black individuals began intermarrying with people of lighter skin coloring such as blancos (whites) and mestizos. This was done as a means of better integration for themselves, and especially their children, into Bolivian society.

Brazil

Brazil is the most populated country in Latin America as well as one of the most racially diverse. According to the Brazilian Institute of Geography and Statistics, Brazil's racial composition is 48% white (92 million) 44% pardo (83 million) 7% black (13 million) 0.50% yellow (1.1 million). The focus on skin color rather than racial origin is controversial. Due to its racial configuration, Brazil is often compared to the US in terms of its race relations, however, the presence of such a strong mixed population in Brazil is cited as being one of its main differences from the US. The most recent censure in Brazil demonstrates that a considerable part of the population is non-white. The pardo category denotes a mixed or multiracial composition. However, it could be further broken down into terms based on the main racial influences on an individual's phenotype.

Brazil's systematic collection of data on race is considered to be one of the most extensive in the region. However, the Brazilian Institute of Geography and Statistics (IBGE) has been continuously criticized for its method of measuring racial demographics.  An important distinction is that Brazil collects data based on color, not race. Thus the 'pardo' category does not actually pertain to a specific phenotype, only to the color of the individual. This means that a 'pardo' person can range from somebody with white and Amerindian ancestry to someone with African and Portuguese ancestry. There is an obvious difference between these two phenotypes that are not represented by the umbrella term of 'pardo'. There have been many studies focusing on the significance of the IBGE's focus on color rather than race. Ellis Monk has published research illustrating the implications of this racial framework on Brazilian society from a sociological perspective. In a discussion of how the government's implementation of a dichotomous white – non-white (mixed races, along with black and Amerindians) He states: "The Brazilian government, beginning in the 1990s, even led campaigns urging Brazilians to view themselves as racially dichotomous, as black or white on the basis of African ancestry, regardless of the color of their skin". This development has continued as it had gained support from African Brazilians and Black consciousness movements who wished to set itself apart as a distinct race with black skin color, similar to the racial framework used in the U.S

The early stages of the Portuguese colonies in Brazilian territory fostered a mixture between Portuguese colonizers, indigenous tribes, and African slaves. This composition was common in most colonies in Latin America. In this sense, several sociologists have compared the Brazilian colonial experience to that of Mexico. Since the publishing of Gilberto Freyre's seminal work Casa-Grande & Senzala, sociologists have looked at Brazil as having a unique colonial history where interracial relations were accepted without religious or class prejudices. Freyre says:The sentiment of nationality in the Brazilian has been deeply affected by the fact that the feudal system did not here permit of a State that was wholly dominant or a Church that was omnipotent, as well as by the circumstance of miscegenation as practiced under the wing of that system and at the same time practiced against it, thus rendering less easy the absolute identification of the ruling class with the pure or quasi-pure European stock of the principal conquerors, the Portuguese. The result is a national sentiment tempered by a sympathy for the foreigner that is so broad as to become, practically, universalism. It would, indeed, be impossible to conceive of a people marching onward toward social democracy that in place of being universal in its tendencies should be narrowly exclusive or ethnocentric.For Freyre, lack of sexual prejudices incentivized racial mixing that produces the wide genetic variety we see today. Portuguese men married and had children with indigenous and African women. The societal consequences of this are that a marked diversification of skin colors occur, blurring the racial ancestry of those considered to have 'mixed race. The increase of influence of one race over another in producing a Brazilian phenotype happened in stages. For example, immigration policy loosened in the late 1940s resulting in the influx of multiple European communities that are now considered to have 'whitened' Brazilian communities in the north and northeast.

British West Indies
Miscegenation has never been illegal in the British West Indies, and the populations of Guyana, Belize, Jamaica, and Trinidad are today among the world's most diverse.

Peru
About 100,000 Chinese coolies (almost all males) from 1849 to 1874 migrated to Peru and intermarried with Peruvian women of Mestizo, European, Amerindian, European/Mestizo, African and mulatto origin. Thus, many Peruvian Chinese today are of mixed Chinese, Spanish, African, or Amerindian ancestry. One estimate for the Chinese-Peruvian mixture is about 1.3–1.6 million. Asian Peruvians are estimated to be 3% of the population, but one source places the number of citizens with some Chinese ancestry at 4.2 million, which equates to 15% of the country's total population. In Peru, non-Chinese women married the mostly male Chinese coolies.

Among the Chinese migrants who went to Peru and Cuba there were almost no women. Some Peruvian women married Chinese male migrants. Chinese men formed relationship with both Peruvian women and Afro-Peruvian women during their labor as coolies. Chinese men had contact with Peruvian women in cities, there they formed relationships had mixed-race babies. These women came from Andean and coastal areas and did not originally come from the cities, in the haciendas on the coast in rural areas, native young women of indígenas (native) and serranas (mountain) origin from the Andes mountains would come to work, these Andean native women were favored as marital partners by Chinese men over Africans.  Matchmakers arranged marriages of Chinese men to indígenas and serranas young women. There was a racist reaction by some Peruvians to the marriages of Peruvian women and Chinese men. When native Peruvian women (cholas and natives, Indias, indígenas) and Chinese men had mixed children, the children were called injertos. When these injertos became a components of Peruvian society, Chinese men then sought out girls of injertos origins as marriage partners. Children born to black mothers were not called injertos. Lower class Peruvians established sexual unions or marriages with the Chinese men and some black and Indian women "bred" with the Chinese according to Alfredo Sachettí, who claimed the mixing was causing the Chinese to suffer from "progressive degeneration", in Casa Grande highland Indian women and Chinese men participated in communal "mass marriages" with each other, arranged when highland women were brought by a Chinese matchmaker after receiving a down payment.

In Peru and Cuba some Indian (Native American), mulatto, black, and white women married or had sexual relations with Chinese men, with marriages of mulatto, black, and white woman being reported by the Cuba Commission Report and in Peru it was reported by the New York Times that Peruvian black and Indian (Native) women married Chinese men to their own advantage and to the disadvantage of the men since they dominated and "subjugated" the Chinese men despite the fact that the labor contract was annulled by the marriage, reversing the roles in marriage with the Peruvian woman holding marital power, ruling the family and making the Chinese men slavish, docile, "servile", "submissive" and "feminine" and commanding them around, reporting that "Now and then ... he [the Chinese man] becomes enamored of the charms of some sombre-hued chola (Native Indian and mestiza woman) or samba (a mixed black woman), and is converted and joins the Church, so that may enter the bonds of wedlock with the dusky señorita." Chinese men were sought out as husbands and considered a "catch" by the "dusky damsels" (Peruvian women) because they were viewed as a "model husband, hard-working, affectionate, faithful and obedient" and "handy to have in the house", the Peruvian women became the "better half" instead of the "weaker vessel" and would command their Chinese husbands "around in fine style" instead of treating them equally, while the labor contract of the Chinese coolie would be nullified by the marriage, the Peruvian wife viewed the nullification merely as the previous "master" handing over authority over the Chinese man to her as she became his "mistress", keeping him in "servitude" to her, speedily ending any complaints and suppositions by the Chinese men that they would have any power in the marriage.

Asia
Inter-ethnic marriage in Southeast Asia dates back to the spread of Indian culture, Hinduism and Buddhism to the region. From the 1st century onwards, mostly male traders and merchants from the Indian subcontinent frequently intermarried with the local female populations in Cambodia, Burma, Champa, Central Siam, the Malay Peninsula, and Malay Archipelago. Many Indianized kingdoms arose in Southeast Asia during the Middle Ages.

From the 9th century onwards, a large number of mostly male Arab traders from the Middle East settled down in the Malay Peninsula and Malay Archipelago, and they intermarried with the local Malay, Indonesian and female populations in the islands later called the Philippines. This contributed to the spread of Islam in Southeast Asia. From the 14th to the 17th centuries, many Chinese, Indian and Arab traders settled down within the maritime kingdoms of Southeast Asia and intermarried with the local female populations. This tradition continued among Portuguese traders who also intermarried with the local populations. In the 16th and 17th centuries, thousands of Japanese people also travelled to Southeast Asia and intermarried with the local women there.

From the tenth to twelfth century, Persian women were to be found in Guangzhou (Canton), some of them in the tenth century like Mei Zhu in the harem of the Emperor Liu Chang, and in the twelfth century large numbers of Persian women lived there, noted for wearing multiple earrings and "quarrelsome dispositions". Multiple women originating from the Persian Gulf lived in Guangzhou's foreign quarter, they were all called "Persian women" (波斯婦 Po-ssu-fu or Bosifu).
Some scholars did not differentiate between Persian and Arab, and some say that the Chinese called all women coming from the Persian Gulf "Persian Women".

The exact number of Amerasians in Vietnam are not known. The U.S soldiers stationed in Vietnam had relationships with locals females, many of the women had origins from clubs, brothels and pubs. The American Embassy once reported there were less than a 1,000 Amerasians. A report by the South Vietnamese Senate Subcommittee suggested there are 15,000 to 20,000 children of mixed American and Vietnamese blood, but this figure was considered low. Congress estimated 20,000 to 30,000 Amerasians by 1975 lived in Vietnam. According to Amerasians Without Borders, they estimated about 25,000 to 30,000 Vietnamese Amerasians were born from American first participation in Vietnam in 1962, and lasted until 1975. Although during the Operation Babylift it was estimated at 23,000.

In the 19th century and early 20th century, there was a network of small numbers of Chinese and Japanese prostitutes being trafficked across Asia, in countries such as China, Japan, Korea, Singapore and India, in what was then known as the "Yellow Slave Traffic". There was also a network of prostitutes from continental Europe being trafficked to India, Ceylon, Singapore, China and Japan at around the same time, in what was then known as the "White Slave Traffic".

In 1905, it was reported that many Russian women were raped which resulted in many Japanese troops being infected with venereal disease.
During World War II, Japanese soldiers engaged in war rape during their invasions across East Asia and Southeast Asia. Some Indo Dutch women, captured in Dutch colonies in Asia, were forced into sexual slavery. More than 20,000 Indonesian women and nearly 300 Dutch women were so treated. A estimated 1000 Timor women and girls who also used as sexual slaves. Melanesian women from New Guinea were also used as comfort women by the Japanese military and as well married Japanese, forming a small number of mixed Japanese-Papuan women born to Japanese fathers and Papuan mothers.

The Indonesian invasion of East Timor and West Papua caused the murders of approximately 300,000 to 400,000 West Papuans and many thousands of women raped.

Sex tourism has emerged in the late 20th century as a controversial aspect of Western tourism and globalization. Sex tourism is typically undertaken internationally by tourists from wealthier countries. Author Nils Ringdal alleges that three out of four men between the ages of 20 and 50 who have visited Asia or Africa have paid for sex.

Female sex tourism also emerged in the late 20th century in Bali. Tens of thousands of single women throng the beaches of Bali in Indonesia every year. For decades, young Balinese men have taken advantage of the louche and laid-back atmosphere to find love and lucre from female tourists—Japanese, European and Australian for the most part—who by all accounts seem perfectly happy with the arrangement.

Central Asia 
Central Asians have descended from a mixture of various peoples, such as the Mongols, Turks, and Iranians. The Mongol conquest of Central Asia in the 13th century resulted in the mass killings of the Iranian-speaking people and Indo-Europeans population of the region, their culture and languages being superseded by that of the Mongolian-Turkic peoples. The remaining surviving population intermarried with invaders. Genetic shows a mixture of East Asian and Caucasian ancestry in all Central Asian people.

Afghanistan 
Genetic analysis of the Hazara people indicate partial Mongolian ancestry. Invading Mongols and Turco-Mongols mixed with the local Iranian population, forming a distinct group. Mongols settled in what is now Afghanistan and mixed with native populations who spoke Persian. A second wave of mostly Chagatai Mongols came from Central Asia and were followed by other Mongolic groups, associated with the Ilkhanate and the Timurids, all of whom settled in Hazarajat and mixed with the local, mostly Persian-speaking population, forming a distinct group.

The analysis also detected Sub-Saharan African lineages in both the paternal and maternal ancestry of Hazara. Among the Hazaras there are 7.5% of African mtDNA haplogroup L with 5.1% of African Y-DNA B. The origin and date of when these admixture occurred are unknown but was believed to have been during the slave trades in Afghanistan.

China
Intermarriage was initially discouraged by the Tang dynasty. In 836 Lu Chun was appointed as governor of Canton, he was disgusted to find Chinese living with foreigners and intermarriage between Chinese and foreigners. Lu enforced separation, banning interracial marriages, and made it illegal for foreigners to own property. Lu Chun believed his principles were just and upright. The 836 law specifically banned Chinese from forming relationships with "dark peoples", which was used to describe foreigners, such as "Iranians, Sogdians, Arabs, Indians, Malays, Sumatrans", among others. The Song dynasty allowed third-generation immigrants with official titles to intermarry with Chinese imperial princesses.

Iranian, Arab, and Turkic women also occasionally migrated to China and mixed with Chinese. From the tenth to twelfth century, Persian women were to be found in Guangzhou (Canton), some of them in the tenth century like Mei Zhu in the harem of the Emperor Liu Chang, and in the twelfth century large numbers of Persian women lived there, noted for wearing multiple earrings and "quarrelsome dispositions". Multiple women originating from the Persian Gulf lived in Guangzhou's foreign quarter; they were all called "Persian women" (波斯婦; Po-szu-fu or Bosifu). Iranian female dancers were in demand in China during this period. During the Sui dynasty, ten young dancing girls were sent from Persia to China. During the Tang dynasty bars were often attended by Iranian or Sogdian waitresses who performed dances for clients.

During the Five Dynasties and Ten Kingdoms Period (Wudai) (907–960), there are examples of Persian women marrying Chinese emperors. Some Chinese officials from the Song Dynasty era also married women from Dashi (Arabia).

By the 14th century, the total population of Muslims in China had grown to 4 million. After Mongol rule had been ended by the Ming dynasty in 1368, this led to a violent Chinese backlash against West and Central Asians. In order to contain the violence, both Mongol and Central Asian Semu Muslim women and men of both sexes were required by Ming Code to marry Han Chinese after the first Ming Emperor Hongwu passed the law in Article 122.

Han women who married Hui men became Hui, and Han men who married Hui women also became Hui.

Of the Han Chinese Li family in Quanzhou, Li Nu, the son of Li Lu, visited Hormuz in Persia in 1376, married a Persian or an Arab girl, and brought her back to Quanzhou. He then converted to Islam. Li Nu was the ancestor of the Ming Dynasty reformer Li Chih.

After the Oghuz Turkmen Salars moved from Samarkand in Central Asia to Xunhua, Qinghai in the early Ming dynasty, they converted Tibetan women to Islam and the Tibetan women were taken as wives by Salar men. A Salar wedding ritual where grains and milk were scattered on a horse by the bride was influenced by Tibetans. After they moved into northern Tibet, the Salars originally practiced the same Gedimu (Gedem) variant of Sunni Islam as the Hui people and adopted Hui practices like using the Hui Jingtang Jiaoyu Islamic education during the Ming dynasty which derived from Yuan dynasty Arabic and Persian primers. One of the Salar primers was called "Book of Diverse Studies" in Chinese. The version of Sunni Islam practiced by Salars was greatly impacted by Salars marrying with Hui who had settled in Xunhua. The Hui introduced new Naqshbandi Sufi orders like Jahriyya and Khafiyya to the Salars and eventually these Sufi orders led to sectarian violence involving Qing soldiers (Han, Tibetans and Mongols) and the Sufis which included the Chinese Muslims (Salars and Hui). Ma Laichi brought the Khafiyya Naqshbandi order to the Salars and the Salars followed the Flowered mosque order (花寺門宦) of the Khafiyya. He preached silent dhikr and simplified Qur'an readings bringing the Arabic text Mingsha jing (明沙經, 明沙勒, 明沙爾 Minshar jing) to China.

The Kargan Tibetans, who live next to the Salar, have mostly become Muslim due to the Salars. The Salar oral tradition recalls that it was around 1370 in which they came from Samarkand to China. The later Qing dynasty and Republic of China Salar General Han Youwen was born to a Tibetan woman named Ziliha (孜力哈) and a Salar father named Aema (阿额玛).

Tibetan women were the original wives of the first Salars to arrive in the region as recorded in Salar oral history. The Tibetans agreed to let their Tibetan women marry Salar men after putting up several demands to accommodate cultural and religious differences. Hui and Salar intermarry due to cultural similarities and following the same Islamic religion. Older Salars married Tibetan women but younger Salars prefer marrying other Salars. Han and Salar mostly do not intermarry with each other unlike marriages of Tibetan women to Salar men. Salars however use Han surnames. Salar patrilineal clans are much more limited than Han patrilineal clans in how much they deal with culture, society or religion. Salar men often marry a lot of non-Salar women and they took Tibetan women as wives after migrating to Xunhua according to historical accounts and folk histories. Salars almost exclusively took non-Salar women as wives like Tibetan women while never giving Salar women to non-Salar men in marriage except for Hui men who were allowed to marry Salar women. As a result, Salars are heavily mixed with other ethnicities.

Salars in Qinghai live on both banks of the Yellow river, south and north, the northern ones are called Hualong or Bayan Salars while the southern ones are called Xunhua Salars. The region north of the Yellow river is a mix of discontinuous Salar and Tibetan villages while the region south of the yellow river is solidly Salar with no gaps in between, since Hui and Salars pushed the Tibetans on the south region out earlier. Tibetan women who converted to Islam were taken as wives on both banks of the river by Salar men. The term for maternal uncle (ajiu) is used for Tibetans by Salars since the Salars have maternal Tibetan ancestry. Tibetans witness Salar life passages in Kewa, a Salar village and Tibetan butter tea is consumed by Salars there as well. Other Tibetan cultural influences like Salar houses having four corners with a white stone on them became part of Salar culture as long as they were not prohibited by Islam. Hui people started assimilating and intermarrying with Salars in Xunhua after migrating there from Hezhou in Gansu due to the Chinese Ming dynasty ruling the Xunhua Salars after 1370 and Hezhou officials governed Xunhua. Many Salars with the Ma surname appear to be of Hui descent since a lot of Salars now have the Ma surname while in the beginning the majority of Salars had the Han surname. Some example of Hezhou Hui who became Salars are the Chenjia (Chen family) and Majia (Ma family) villages in Altiuli where the Chen and Ma families are Salars who admit their Hui ancestry. Marriage ceremonies, funerals, birth rites and prayer were shared by both Salar and Hui as they intermarried and shared the same religion since more and more Hui moved into the Salar areas on both banks of the Yellow river. Many Hui married Salars and eventually it became far more popular for Hui and Salar to intermarry due to both being Muslims than to non-Muslim Han, Mongols and Tibetans. The Salar language and culture however was highly impacted in the 14th-16th centuries in their original ethnogenesis by marriage with Mongol and Tibetan non-Muslims with many loanwords and grammatical influence by Mongol and Tibetan in their language. Salars were multilingual in Salar and Mongol and then in Chinese and Tibetan as they trade extensively in the Ming, Qing and Republic of China periods on the yellow river in Ningxia and Lanzhou in Gansu.

Salars and Tibetans both use the term maternal uncle (ajiu in Salar and Chinese, azhang in Tibetan) to refer to each other, referring to the fact that Salars are descendants of Tibetan women marrying Salar men. After using these terms they often repeat the historical account how Tibetan women were married by 2,000 Salar men who were the First Salars to migrate to Qinghai. These terms illustrate that Salars were viewed separately from the Hui by Tibetans. According to legend, the marriages between Tibetan women and Salar men came after a compromise between demands by a Tibetan chief and the Salar migrants. The Salar say Wimdo valley was ruled by a Tibetan and he demanded the Salars follow four rules in order to marry Tibetan women. He asked them to install on their houses's four corners Tibetan Buddhist prayer flags, to pray with Tibetan Buddhist prayer wheels with the Buddhist mantra om mani padma hum and to bow before statues of Buddha. The Salars refused those demands saying they did not recite mantras or bow to statues since they believed in only one creator god and were Muslims. They compromised on the flags in houses by putting stones on their houses' corners instead of Tibetan Buddhist prayer flags. Some Tibetans do not differentiate between Salar and Hui due to their Islamic religion. In 1996, Wimdo township only had one Salar because Tibetans whined about the Muslim call to prayer and a mosque built in the area in the early 1990s so they kicked out most of the Salars from the region. Salars were bilingual in Salar and Tibetan due to intermarriage with Tibetan women and trading. It is far less likely for a Tibetan to speak Salar. Tibetan women in Xiahe also married Muslim men who came there as traders before the 1930s.

In eastern Qinghai and Gansu there were cases of Tibetan women who stayed in their Buddhist Lamaist religion while marrying Chinese Muslim men and they would have different sons who would be Buddhist and Muslims, the Buddhist sons became Lamas while the other sons were Muslims. Hui and Tibetans married Salars.

In the frontier districts of Sichuan, numerous half Chinese-Tibetans were found. Tibetan women were glad to marry Chinese traders and soldiers. Some Chinese traders married Tibetan girls. Traders and officials in ancient times were often forbidden to bring Chinese women with them to Tibet, so they tended to marry Tibetan women; the male offspring were considered Chinese and female offspring as Tibetan. Special names were used for these children of Chinese fathers and Tibetan mothers. They often assimilated into the Tibetan population. Chinese and Nepalese in Tibet married Tibetan women.

Chinese men also married Turkic Uyghur women in Xinjiang from 1880 to 1949. Sometimes poverty influenced Uyghur women to marry Chinese. These marriages were not recognized by local mullahs since Muslim women were not allowed to marry non-Muslim men under Islamic law. This did not stop the women because they enjoyed advantages, such as not being subject to certain taxes. Uyghur women married to the Chinese also did not have to wear a veil and they received their husband's property upon his death. These women were forbidden from being buried in Muslim graves. The children of Chinese men and Uyghur women were considered as Uyghur. Some Chinese soldiers had Uyghur women as temporary wives, and after the man's military service was up, the wife was left behind or sold, and if it was possible, sons were taken, and daughters were sold.

After the Russian Civil War, a huge number of Russians settled in the Manchuria region of China. One Chinese scholar Zhang Jingsheng wrote essays in 1924 and 1925 in various Chinese journals praising the advantages of miscegenation between Russians and Chinese, saying that interracial sex would promote greater understandings between the two peoples, and produce children with the best advantages of both peoples. Zhang argued that Russians were taller and had greater physical strength than the Han, but the Chinese were gentler and kinder than the Russians, and so intermarriage between the two peoples would ensure children with the advantages of both. Zhang wrote that the Russians were a tough "hard" people while the Chinese had a softer physique and more compassion, and miscegenation between the two would only benefit both. Zhang mentioned since 1918 about one million Russian women who had already married Chinese men and argued already the children born of these marriages had the strength and toughness of the Russians and the gentleness and kindness of the Chinese. Zhang wrote what he ultimately wanted was an "Asia for Asians", and believed his plans for miscegenation were the best way of achieving this. The South Korean historian Bong Inyoung wrote that Zhang's plans were based on a certain Social Darwinist thinking and a tendency to assign characteristics to various peoples in a way that might be considered objectionable today, but he was no racist as he did not see fair skin of the Russians as any reason why the Chinese should not marry them.

European travellers noted that many Han Chinese in Xinjiang married Uyghur (who were called turki) women and had children with them. A Chinese was spotted with a "young" and "good looking" Uyghur wife and another Chinese left behind his Uyghur wife and child in Khotan.

After 1950, some intermarriage between Han and Uyghur peoples continued. A Han married a Uyghur woman in 1966 and had three daughters with her, and other cases of intermarriage also continued.

Ever since the 1960s, African students were allowed by the Chinese government to study in China as friendly relations with Africans and African-related people was important to CCP's "Third World" coalition. Many African male students began to intermingle with the local Chinese women. Relationships between black men and Chinese women often led to numerous clashes between Chinese and African students in the 1980s as well as grounds for arrest and deportation of African students. The Nanjing anti-African protests of 1988 were triggered by confrontations between Chinese and Africans. New rules and regulations were made in order to stop African men from consorting with Chinese women. Two African men who were escorting Chinese women on a Christmas Eve party were stopped at the gate and along with several other factors escalated. The Nanjing protests lasted from Christmas Eve of 1988 to January 1989. Many new rules were set after the protests ended, including one where black men could only have one Chinese girlfriend at a time whose visits were limited to the lounge area.

There is a small but growing population of mixed marriages between male African (mostly Nigerian) traders and local Chinese women in the city of Guangzhou where it is estimated that in 2013 there are 400 African-Chinese families. The rise in mixed marriages has not been without controversy. The state, fearing fraud marriages, has strictly regulated matters. In order to obtain government-issued identification (which is required to attend school), the children must be registered under the Chinese mother's family name. Many African fathers, fearing that in doing so, they would relinquish their parental rights, have instead chosen to not send their children to school. There are efforts to open an African-Chinese school but it would first require government authorization.

Taiwan
During the Siege of Fort Zeelandia of 1661–1662 in which Chinese Ming loyalist forces commanded by Koxinga besieged and defeated the Dutch East India Company and conquered Taiwan, the Chinese took Dutch women and children prisoner. Koxinga took Hambroek's teenage daughter as a concubine, and Dutch women were sold to Chinese soldiers to become their wives. In 1684 some of these Dutch wives were still captives of the Chinese.

Some Dutch physical looks like auburn and red hair among people in regions of south Taiwan are a consequence of this episode of Dutch women becoming concubines to the Chinese commanders.

Hong Kong

Many Tanka women conceived children with foreign men. Ernest John Eitel mentioned in 1889 how an important change had taken place among Eurasian girls, the offspring of illicit connections: instead of becoming concubines, they were commonly brought up respectably and married to Hong Kong Chinese husbands. Many Hong Kong born Eurasians were assimilated into the Hong Kong society by intermarriage with the Cantonese population. A good example of a Cantonese Eurasian is Nancy Kwan, a Hollywood sex symbol. Kwan was of Eurasian origin, born in 1939 in Hong Kong to a father who was a Cantonese architect and mother who is a model of British descent. The martial artist Bruce Lee had a Cantonese father and a Eurasian mother.

Ernest John Eitel controversially claimed that most "half caste" people in Hong Kong were descended exclusively from Europeans having a relationship with Tanka women. The theory that most of the Eurasian mixed race Hong Kong people are descended only from Tanka women and European men, and not ordinary Cantonese women, has been backed up by other researchers who pointed out that Tanka women freely consorted with foreigners due to the fact that they were not bound by the same Confucian traditions as the Cantonese, and having a relationship with a European man was advantageous for Tanka women, but Lethbridge criticized it as "a 'myth' propagated by xenophobic Cantonese to account for the establishment of the Hong Kong Eurasian community". Carl Smith's study in the late 1960s on the protected women seems, to some degree, to support Ernest John Eitel's theory. Smith says that the Tankas experienced certain restrictions within the traditional Chinese social structure. Being a group marginal to the traditional Chinese society of the Puntis (Cantonese), they did not have the same social pressure in dealing with Europeans. The ordinary Cantonese women did not sleep with European men, thus the Eurasian population was formed mostly from Tanka and European admixture.

They invaded Hongkong the moment the settlement was started, living at first on boats in the harbour with their numerous families, gradually settling on shore. They have maintained ever since almost a monopoly of the supply of pilots and ships' crews, of the fish trade and the cattle trade, but unfortunately also of the trade in girls and women. Strange to say, when the settlement was first started, it was estimated that some 2,000 of these Tan-ka people had flocked to Hongkong, but at the present time they are about the same number, a tendency having set in among them to settle on shore rather than on the water and to disavow their Tan-ka extraction in order to mix on equal terms with the mass of the Chinese community. The half-caste population in Hongkong was, from the earliest days of the settlement of the Colony and down to the present day, almost exclusively the off-spring of these Tan-ka people. But, like the Tan-ka people themselves, they are happily under the influence of a process of continuous re-absorption into the mass of the Chinese residents of the Colony.

South Asians have been living in Hong Kong throughout the colonial period, before the independence in 1947 into the nations of India and Pakistan. They migrated to Hong Kong and worked as police officers as well as army officers during colonial rule. 25,000 of the Muslims in Hong Kong trace their roots back to what is now Pakistan. Around half of them belong to 'local boy' families, Muslims of mixed Chinese and South Asian ancestry, descended from early Indian/Pakistani Muslim immigrants who took local Chinese wives and brought their children up as Muslims.

Macao
The early Macanese ethnic group was formed from Portuguese men intermarrying with Malay, Japanese and Indian women. The Portuguese encouraged Chinese migration to Macao, and most Macanese in Macao were formed from intermarriages between Portuguese and Chinese. In 1810, the total population of Macao was about 4,033, of which 1,172 were white men, 1,830 were white women, 425 were male slaves, and 606 were female slaves. In 1830, the population increased to 4,480 and the breakdown was 1,202 white men, 2,149 white women, 350 male slaves, and 779 female slaves. There is reason to speculate that large numbers of white women were involved in some forms of prostitution which would probably explain the abnormality in the ratio between men and women among the white population.

Rarely did Chinese women marry Portuguese; initially, mostly Goans, Ceylonese (from today's Sri Lanka), Indochinese, Malay, and Japanese women were the wives of the Portuguese men in Macau. Japanese girls would be purchased in Japan by Portuguese men. Many Chinese became Macanese simply by converting to Catholicism, and had no ancestry from Portuguese, having assimilated into the Macanese people. The majority of the early intermarriages of people from China with Portuguese were between Portuguese men and women of Tanka origin, who were considered the lowest class of people in China and had relations with Portuguese settlers and sailors, or low class Chinese women. Western men were refused by high class Chinese women, who did not marry foreigners. In fact, in those days, the matrimonial context of production was usually constituted by Chinese women of low socio-economic status who were married to or concubines of Portuguese or Macanese men. Very rarely did Chinese women of higher status agree to marry a Westerner. As Deolinda argues in one of her short stories, "even should they have wanted to do so out of romantic infatuation, they would not be allowed to. Macanese men and women also married with the Portuguese and Chinese; as a result, some Macanese became indistinguishable from the Chinese or Portuguese population. Because the majority of the Chinese population who migrated to Macao was Cantonese, Macao became a Cantonese speaking society, and other ethnic groups became fluent in Cantonese. Most Macanese had paternal Portuguese heritage until 1974." It was in the 1980s that Macanese and Portuguese women began to marry men who defined themselves ethnically as Chinese, which resulted in many Macanese with Cantonese paternal ancestry.

Literature in Macao was written about love affairs and marriage between the Tanka women and Portuguese men, like "A-Chan, A Tancareira", by Henrique de Senna Fernandes.

After the handover of Macao to China in 1999 many Macanese migrated to other countries. Of the Portuguese and Macanese women who stayed in Macao, many married local Cantonese men, and so many Macanese also now have Cantonese paternal heritage. There are between 25,000 and 46,000 Macanese, but only 5,000–8,000 live in Macao, while most live in Latin America, the U.S., Portugal. Unlike the Macanese of Macao who are strictly of Chinese and Portuguese heritage, many Macanese living abroad have intermarried with the local population of the U.S. and Latin America and have only partial Macanese heritage.

India

Although the Indian subcontinent is virtually endogamous with wedding practices in India overwhelmingly occurring within the same caste and religion, interracial relationships have occurred predating recorded history and have been historically recorded since antiquity. Inter-marriage in the Indian subcontinent has historically been applied between different ethnolinguistic groups, varna, caste, and religions. One of the critical aspects of inter-marriage in India is inter-caste marriage, which is based around the construct of caste.

Various groups of people have been intermarrying between ethnolinguistic groups for millennia in the Indian subcontinent, including speakers of the Dravidian, Indo-Aryan, Austroasiatic, and Tibeto-Burman languages. This has often formed syncretic languages and regional dialects.

Intermarriage rates in India varies greatly among the states and union territories of India. In modern India, intermarriage is most likely to occur involving spouse from the same socioeconomic strata.  

Afonso de Albuquerque conquered Goa in 1510. He inaugurated the policy of Portuguese men marrying Indian women who had converted to Catholicism, the consequence of which was a great miscegenation in Goa and other Portuguese territories in Asia. During the late 16th century and 17th century, there was a community of over thousand Japanese slaves and traders in Goa, who were either Japanese Christians fleeing persecution in Japan, or young Japanese women and girls brought or captured as sexual slaves by Portuguese traders and their South Asian lascar crew members from Japan. In both cases, they often intermarried with the local population in Goa. 

One example of an interracial liaison during colonial times involved Hyderabadi noblewoman Khair-un-Nissa and her relationship to Scottish official James Achilles Kirkpatrick.

The 600,000-strong Anglo-Indian community has been formed by British and Indian relationships, with significant amount of the diaspora living in Bangladesh, India, UK, Australia, and North America. Such syncretic relationships have had an influence on arts and culture.

As British women began arriving in India in large numbers around the early to mid-19th century, mostly as family members of officers and soldiers, British men became less likely to marry Indian women. Intermarriage declined after the events of the Rebellion of 1857, after which several anti-miscegenation laws were implemented.

The stereotype of the "Indian rapist" occurred frequently in English literature of the late 19th and early 20th centuries. This coincided with a period after the Indian Rebellion when the colonial government officially outlawed miscegenation, a decision which was influenced by the reports of rape supposedly committed by Indian rebels during the 1857 rebellion. These policies remained in effect until Indian independence in 1947.

The 1883 Ilbert Bill, which would have granted Indian judges the right to judge British offenders, was opposed by many Britons in India on the grounds that Indian judges could not be trusted in dealing with cases involving British females, with miscegenation and ethnic tensions playing a large part in opposition to the bill.

The stereotype of Indian males as rapists who targeted British women in India was critiqued by several novels such as E. M. Forster's A Passage to India (1924) and Paul Scott's The Jewel in the Crown (1966), both of which involve an Indian male being wrongly accused of raping a British female. Some activists argued that these stereotypes were wrong because Indians had proven to be more receptive to women's rights and progress, with the University of Calcutta becoming one of the first universities to admit female graduates to its degree programmes in 1878, before any of the universities in Britain did.

When Burma was ruled under the administration of British India, millions of Indians, mostly Muslims, migrated there. The small population of mixed descendants of Indian males and local Burmese females are called "Zerbadees", often in a pejorative sense implying mixed race.

In Assam, local Indians married several waves of Chinese migrants during the British colonial era, to the point where it became hard to physically differentiate Chinese in Assam from locals during the time of their internment during the 1962 war, and the majority of these Chinese in Assam were married to Indians, and some of these Indian women were deported to China with their husbands.

In the 19th century, when the British Straits Settlement shipped Chinese convicts to be jailed in India, the Chinese men then settled in the Nilgiri mountains near Naduvattam after their release and married Tamil Paraiyan women, having mixed Chinese-Tamil children with them. They were documented by Edgar Thurston. Paraiyan is also anglicized as "pariah".

Thurston described the colony of the Chinese men with their Tamil pariah wives and children: "Halting in the course of a recent anthropological expedition on the western side of the Nilgiri plateau, in the midst of the Government Cinchona plantations, I came across a small settlement of Chinese, who have squatted for some years on the slopes of the hills between Naduvatam and Gudalur, and developed, as the result of ' marriage ' with Tamil pariah women, into a colony, earning an honest livelihood by growing vegetables, cultivating coffee on a small scale, and adding to their income from these sources by the economic products of the cow. An ambassador was sent to this miniature Chinese Court with a suggestion that the men should, in return for monies, present themselves before me with a view to their measurements being recorded. The reply which came back was in its way racially characteristic as between Hindus and Chinese. In the case of the former, permission to make use of their bodies for the purposes of research depends essentially on a pecuniary transaction, on a scale varying from two to eight annas. The Chinese, on the other hand, though poor, sent a courteous message to the effect that they did not require payment in money, but would be perfectly happy if I would give them, as a memento, copies of their photographs." Thurston further describe a specific family: "The father was a typical Chinaman, whose only grievance was that, in the process of conversion to Christianity, he had been obliged to 'cut him tail off.' The mother was a typical Tamil Pariah of dusky hue. The colour of the children was more closely allied to the yellowish tint of the father than to the dark tint of the mother; and the semimongol parentage was betrayed in the slant eyes, flat nose, and (in one case) conspicuously prominent cheek-bones." Thurston's description of the Chinese-Tamil families were cited by others, one mentioned "an instance mating between a Chinese male with a Tamil Pariah female" A 1959 book described attempts made to find out what happened to the colony of mixed Chinese and Tamils.

An increasing number of non-Tibetan Muslim men are marrying Ladakhi Tibetan Buddhist women in Ladakh.

Pakistan
The Balti people of Baltistan in Pakistan and Kargil in India are descendants of Tibetan Buddhists who  converted to the Noorbakshia sect of Islam. With the passage of time a large number converted to Shia Islam, and a few converted to Sunni Islam. Their Balti language is highly archaic and conservative and closer to Classical Tibetan than other Tibetan languages. The Balti are speakers of a conservative Tibetan dialect in northern Pakistan, Baltistant. Most other Tibetan dialects lost Classical Tibetan consonant clusters that are preserved in Balti. However DNA testing revealed that while Tibetan  mtDNA makes up the majority of the Balti's female ancestry, the Balti paternal ancestry has foreign Near Eastern Y haplogroups of non-Tibetan origin.

Sri Lanka
In Ceylon (present day Sri Lanka), interracial relationships between Dutch, British and Portuguese men and local women were common. The 65,000-strong Burgher community was formed by the interracial marriages of Dutch and Portuguese men with local Sinhalese and Tamil women. In addition to intermarriage, inter-ethnic prostitution in India was also fairly common at the time, when British officers would frequently visit Indian nautch dancers. In the mid-19th century, there were around 40,000 British soldiers but fewer than 2,000 British officials present in India. Many British and other European officers had their own harems made up of Indian women similar to those the Nawabs and kings of India had. In the 19th century and early 20th century, thousands of women and girls from continental Europe were also trafficked into British India (and Ceylon), where they worked as prostitutes servicing both British soldiers and local Indian (and Ceylonese) men.

Japan

Inter-ethnic marriage in Japan dates back to the 7th century, when Chinese and Korean immigrants began intermarrying with the local Japanese population. In the 1590s, over 50,000 Koreans were forcibly brought to Japan during Hideyoshi's invasions of Korea, where they intermarried with the local population. In the 16th and 17th centuries, around 58,000 Japanese travelled abroad, many of whom intermarried with the local women in Southeast Asia. During the anti-Christian persecutions in 1596, many Japanese Christians fled to Macau and other Portuguese colonies such as Goa, where there was a community of Japanese slaves and traders by the early 17th century. Intermarriage with the local populations in these Portuguese colonies also took place. Portuguese traders in Japan also intermarried with the local Christian women.

From the 15th century, Chinese, Korean and other Far Eastern visitors frequented brothels in Japan. This practice later continued among visitors from the "Western Regions", mainly European traders. This began with the arrival of Portuguese ships to Japan in the 16th century. Portuguese visitors and their South Asian (and sometimes African) crewmembers often engaged in slavery in Japan, where they bought Japanese slaves who were then taken to Macau and other Portuguese colonies in Southeast Asia, the Americas, and India. Later European East India companies, including those of the Dutch and British, also engaged in prostitution in Japan. Marriage and sexual relations between European merchants and Japanese women was usual during this period.

Many documents mention the large slave trade along with protests against the enslavement of Japanese. Although the actual number of slaves is debated, the proportions on the number of slaves tends to be exaggerated by the Japanese as part of anti-Portuguese propaganda. At least more than several hundreds of Japanese women were sold. 
A large slave trade developed in which Portuguese purchased hundreds of Japanese as slaves in Japan and sold them to various locations overseas, including Portugal itself, throughout the sixteenth and seventeenth centuries. Many documents mention the large slave trade along with protests against the enslavement of Japanese. Japanese slaves are believed to be the first of their nation to end up in Europe, and the Portuguese purchased large numbers of hundreds Japanese slave girls to bring to Portugal for sexual purposes, as noted by the Church in 1555. King Sebastian feared that it was having a negative effect on Catholic proselytization since the slave trade in Japanese was growing to massive proportions, so he commanded that it be banned in 1571.

Japanese slave women were even sold as concubines to black African crewmembers, along with their European counterparts serving on Portuguese ships trading in Japan, mentioned by Luis Cerqueira, a Portuguese Jesuit, in a 1598 document. Japanese slaves were brought by the Portuguese to Macau, where some of them not only ended up being enslaved to Portuguese, but as slaves to other slaves, with the Portuguese owning Malay and African slaves, who in turn owned Japanese slaves of their own.

Karayuki-san, literally meaning "Ms. Gone Abroad", were Japanese women who traveled to or were trafficked to East Asia, Southeast Asia, Manchuria, Siberia and as far as San Francisco in the second half of the 19th century and the first half of the 20th century to work as prostitutes, courtesans and geisha. In the 19th and early 20th centuries, there was a network of Japanese prostitutes being trafficked across Asia, in countries such as China, Japan, Korea, Singapore and British India, in what was then known as the 'Yellow Slave Traffic'.

In the early part of the Shōwa era, Japanese governments executed a eugenic policy to limit the birth of children with inferior traits, as well as aiming to protect the life and health of mothers. Family Center staff also attempted to discourage marriage between Japanese women and Korean men who had been recruited from the peninsula as laborers following its annexation by Japan in 1910. In 1942, a survey report argued that "the Korean laborers brought to Japan, where they have established permanent residency, are of the lower classes and therefore of inferior constitution ... By fathering children with Japanese women, these men could lower the caliber of the Yamato minzoku."

In 1928, journalist Shigenori Ikeda promoted 21 December as the blood-purity day (junketsu de) and sponsored free blood tests at the Tokyo Hygiene laboratory. By the early 1930s, detailed "eugenic marriage" questionnaires were printed or inserted in popular magazines for public consumption. Promoters like Ikeda were convinced that these marriage surveys would not only ensure the eugenic fitness of spouses but also help avoid class differences that could disrupt and even destroy marriage. The goal was to create a database of individuals and their entire households which would enable eugenicists to conduct in-depth surveys of any given family's genealogy.

Historian S. Kuznetsov, dean of the Department of History of the Irkutsk State University, one of the first researchers of the topic, interviewed thousands of former internees and came to the following conclusion: romantic relations between Japanese internees and Russian women were not uncommon. For example, in the city of Kansk, Krasnoyarsk Krai, about 50 Japanese married locals and stayed. Today many Russian women married Japanese men, often for the benefit of long-term residence and work rights. Some of their mixed offspring stay in Japan while others to Russia.

To prevent venereal diseases and rape by Japanese soldiers and to provide comfort to soldiers and head off espionage, the Imperial Japanese Army established "comfort stations" in the Greater East Asia Co-Prosperity Sphere where around 200,000 women, mostly from Korea and China, were recruited or kidnapped by the Kempeitai or the Tokeitai as comfort women.

One of the last eugenic measures of the Shōwa regime was taken by the Higashikuni government. On 19 August 1945, the Home Ministry ordered local government offices to establish a prostitution service for Allied soldiers to preserve the "purity" of the "Japanese race". The official declaration stated that: "Through the sacrifice of thousands of "Okichis" of the Shōwa era, we shall construct a dike to hold back the mad frenzy of the occupation troops and cultivate and preserve the purity of our race long into the future...."

According to Peter Schrijvers in The GI War against Japan: American Soldiers in Asia and the Pacific during World War II, rape "reflects a burning need to establish total dominance of the enemy". According to Xavier Guillaume, US soldiers' rape of Japanese women was "general practice". Schrijvers states regarding rapes on Okinawa that "The estimate of one Okinawan historian for the entire three-month period of the campaign exceeds 10,000. A figure that does not seem unlikely when one realizes that during the first 10 days of the occupation of Japan there were 1,336 reported cases of rape of Japanese women by American soldiers in Kanagawa prefecture alone".

However, despite being told by the Japanese military that they would suffer rape, torture and murder at the hands of the Americans, Japanese civilians "were often surprised at the comparatively humane treatment they received from the American enemy." According to Islands of Discontent: Okinawan Responses to Japanese and American Power by Mark Selden, the Americans "did not pursue a policy of torture, rape, and murder of civilians as Japanese military officials had warned".

Japanese society, with its ideology of homogeneity, has traditionally been intolerant of ethnic and other differences. Men or women of mixed ancestry, foreigners, and members of minority groups face discrimination in a variety of forms. In 2005, a United Nations report expressed concerns about racism in Japan and that government recognition of the depth of the problem was not realistic. In 2005, Japanese Minister Tarō Asō called Japan a "one-race" country.

The Japanese public was thus astounded by the sight of some 45,000 so-called "pan pan girls" (prostitutes) fraternizing with American soldiers during the occupation. In 1946, the 200 wives of U.S. officers landing in Japan to visit their husbands also had a similar impact when many of these reunited couples were seen walking hand in hand and kissing in public. Both prostitution and marks of affection had been hidden from the public until then, and this "democratization of eroticism" was a source of surprise, curiosity, and even envy. The occupation set new relationship models for Japanese men and women: the practice of modern "dating" spread, and activities such as dancing, movies, and coffee were not limited to "pan pan girls" and American troops anymore and became popular among young Japanese couples.

Korea
Inter-ethnic marriage in Korea dates back to the arrival of Muslims in Korea during the Middle Ages, when Persian and Turkic navigators, traders and slaves settled in Korea and married local Korean people. Some assimilation into Buddhism and Shamanism eventually took place, owing to Korea's geographical isolation from the Muslim world.

There are several Korean clans that are descended from such intermarriages. For example, the Deoksu Jang clan, claiming some 30,000 Korean members, views Jang Sunnyong, a Central Asian who married a Korean female, as their ancestor. Another clan, Gyeongju Seol, claiming at least 2,000 members in Korea, view a Central Asian (probably a Uyghur) named Seol Son as their ancestor.

There are even cases of Korean kings marrying princesses from abroad. For example, the Korean text Samguk Yusa about the Gaya kingdom (it was absorbed by the kingdom of Silla later), indicate that in 48 AD, King Kim Suro of Gaya (the progenitor of the Gimhae Kim clan) took a princess (Princess Heo) from the "Ayuta nation" (which is the Korean name for the city of Ayodhya in North India) as his bride and queen. Princess Heo belonged to the Mishra royal family of Ayodhya. According to the Samguk Yusa, the princess had a dream about a heavenly fair handsome king from a far away land who was awaiting heaven's anointed ride. After Princess Heo had the dream, she asked her parents, the king and queen of Ayodhya, for permission to set out and seek the foreign prince, which the king and queen urged with the belief that God orchestrated the whole fate. That king was no other than King Kim Suro of the Korean Gaya kingdom.

6,423 Korean women married US military personnel as war brides during and immediately after the Korean War. The average number of Korean women marrying US military personnel each year was about 1,500 per year in the 1960s and 2,300 per year in the 1970s. Since the beginning of the Korean War in 1950, Korean women have immigrated to the United States as the wives of American soldiers. Based on extensive oral interviews and archival research, Beyond the Shadow of the Camptowns tells the stories of these women, from their presumed association with U.S. military camptowns and prostitution to their struggles within the intercultural families they create in the United States.

International marriages now make up 13% of all marriages in South Korea. Most of these marriages are unions between a Korean male and a foreign female usually from China, Japan, Vietnam, the Philippines, United States, Mongolia, Thailand, or Russia. On the other hand, Korean females have married foreign males from Japan, China, the United States, Bangladesh, Pakistan, Philippines, and Nepal. Between 1990 and 2005, there have been 159,942 Korean males and 80,813 Korean females married to foreigners.

South Korea is among the world's most ethnically homogeneous nations. Koreans have traditionally valued unmixed blood as the most important feature of Korean identity. The term "Kosian", referring to someone who has a Korean father and a non-Korean mother, is considered offensive by some who prefer to identify themselves or their children as Korean. Moreover, the Korean office of Amnesty International has claimed that the word "Kosian" represents racial discrimination. Kosian children, like those of other mixed-race backgrounds in Korea, often face discrimination.

Malaysia and Singapore
In West Malaysia and Singapore, the majority of inter-ethnic marriages are between Chinese and Indians. The offspring of such marriages are informally known as "Chindian", although the Malaysian government only classifies them by their father's ethnicity. As the majority of these intermarriages usually involve an Indian groom and Chinese bride, the majority of Chindians in Malaysia are usually classified as "Indian" by the Malaysian government. As for the Malays, who are predominantly Muslim, legal restrictions in Malaysia make it uncommon for them to intermarry with either the Indians, who are predominantly Hindu, or the Chinese, who are predominantly Buddhist and Taoist. Non-Muslims are required to convert to Islam in order to marry Muslims. However, this has not entirely stopped intermarriage between the Malays and the Chinese and Indians. The Muslim Chinese community is small and has only a negligible impact on the socio-economy and demography of the region.

It is common for Arabs in Singapore and Malaysia to take local Malay and Jawi Peranakan wives, due to a common Islamic faith. The Chitty people, in Singapore and the Malacca state of Malaysia, are a Tamil people with considerable Malay descent, which was due to the first Tamil settlers taking local wives, since they did not bring along any of their own women with them. According to government statistics, the population of Singapore as of September 2007 was 4.68 million, of whom multiracial people, including Chindians and Eurasians, formed 2.4%.

In the East Malaysian states of Sabah and Sarawak, intermarriage is common between Chinese and native tribes such as the Murut and Dusun in Sabah, and the Iban and Bisaya in Sarawak. This has resulted in a potpourri of cultures in both states where many people claiming to be of native descent have some Chinese blood in them, and many Chinese have native blood in them. The offspring of these mixed marriages are called 'Sino-(name of tribe)', e.g. Sino-Dusun. Normally, if the father is Chinese, the offspring will adopt Chinese culture and if the father is native then native culture will be adopted, but this is not always the case. These Sino-natives are usually fluent in Malay and English. A smaller number are able to speak Chinese dialects and Mandarin, especially those who have received education in vernacular Chinese schools.

The Eurasians in West Malaysia and Singapore are descendants of Europeans and locals, mostly Portuguese or British colonial settlers who have taken local wives.

Myanmar (Burma)
Burmese Muslims are the descendants of Bengalis, Indian Muslims, Arabs, Persians, Turks, Pathans, Chinese Muslims, and Malays who settled in Burma and married members of the local Burmese population as well as members of other Burmese ethnic groups such as the Rakhine, Shan, Karen, and Mon.

The oldest Muslim group in Burma (Myanmar) are the Rohingya people, who some believe are descended from Bengalis who settled in Burma and married native females in Rakhine State after the 7th century, but this is just a theory. When Burma was ruled by the British India administration, millions of Indians, mostly Muslims, migrated there. The small group of people who are the mixed descendants of Indian males and local Burmese females are called "Zerbadees", a term which is frequently used in a pejorative way in order to imply that they are people of mixed race. The Panthays, a group of Chinese Muslims descended from West Asians and Central Asians, migrated from China and also intermarried with local Burmese females.

In addition, Burma has an estimated 52,000 Anglo-Burmese people, descended from British and Burmese people. Anglo-Burmese people frequently intermarried with Anglo-Indian immigrants, who eventually assimilated into the Anglo-Burmese community.

The All India Digest stated that when a Chinese man wanted to marry a Burmese woman, he needed to prove that he previously adopted and was currently following the Burmese form of Buddhism because it was assumed that even though he was currently using a Burmese name, he was still practicing Chinese Buddhism. Since many Chinese in Burma gave themselves Burmese names but continued to practice Chinese Buddhism, the adoption of a Burmese name was not proof that he had adopted Burmese Buddhism, therefore, Chinese Buddhist customary law must be followed in such cases.

Philippines

Historically, admixture has been an ever-present and pervasive phenomenon in the Philippines. The Philippines were originally settled by Australoid peoples who are called Negritos (different from other australoid groups) which now form the country's aboriginal community. Some admixture may have occurred between this earlier group and the mainstream Malayo-Polynesian population.

A considerable number of the population in the town of Cainta, Rizal, are descended from Indian soldiers who mutinied against the British Indian Army when the British briefly occupied the Philippines in 1762–63. These Indian soldiers, called Sepoy, settled in towns and intermarried with native women. Cainta residents of Indian descent are very visible today, particularly in Barrio Dayap near Brgy. Sto Niño.

There has been a Chinese presence in the Philippines since the 9th century. However, large-scale migrations of Chinese to the Philippines only started during the Spanish colonial era, when the world market was opened to the Philippines. It is estimated that among Filipinos, 10%–20% have some Chinese ancestry and 1.5% are "full-blooded" Chinese.

According to the American anthropologist Dr. H. Otley Beyer, the ancestry of Filipinos is 2% Arab. This dates back to when Arab traders intermarried with the local Malay Filipina female populations during the pre-Spanish history of the Philippines. Major Arab migration to the Philippines coincided with the spread of Islam in the region. Filipino-Muslim royal families from the Sultanate of Sulu and the Sultanate of Maguindanao claim Arab descent even going as far as claiming direct lineage from Muhammad. Such intermarriage mostly took place around the Mindanao island area, but the arrival of Spanish Conquistadors to the Philippines abruptly halted the spread of Islam further north into the Philippines. Intermarriage with Spanish people later became more prevalent after the Philippines was colonized by the Spanish Empire.

When the Spanish colonized the Philippines, a significant portion of the Filipino population mixed with the Spanish. When the United States took the Philippines from Spain during the Spanish–American War, much intermixing of Americans, both white and black, took place on the island of Luzon where the US had a Naval Base and Air Force Base, even after the USA gave the Philippines independence after World War II. First children and descendants of the male Filipino population with Spanish surnames who intermarried with the white American female population may be considered Spanish mestizos. The descendants of Filipinos and Europeans are today known as mestizos, following the term used in other former Spanish colonies.

Much mixing with the Japanese also took place due to the war rapes of Filipina women during World War II. Today there is an increasing number of Japanese men marrying Filipina women and fathering children by them whose family remains behind in the Philippines and are financially supported by their Japanese fathers who make regular visits to the Philippines. Today mixed-race marriages have a mixed perception in the Philippines. Most urban centers like Manila and Cebu are more willing to accept interracial marriages than rural areas.

Vietnam

Much of the business conducted with foreign men in Southeast Asia was done by the local women, who engaged in both sexual and mercantile intercourse with foreign male traders. A Portuguese and Malay speaking Vietnamese woman who lived in Macao for an extensive period of time was the person who interpreted for the first diplomatic meeting between Cochin-China and a Dutch delegation, she served as an interpreter for three decades in the Cochin-China court with an old woman who had been married to three husbands, one Vietnamese and two Portuguese. The cosmopolitan exchange was facilitated by the marriage of Vietnamese women to Portuguese merchants. Those Vietnamese woman were married to Portuguese men and lived in Macao which was how they became fluent in Malay and Portuguese.

Alexander Hamilton said that "The Tonquiners used to be very desirous of having a brood of Europeans in their country, for which reason the greatest nobles thought it no shame or disgrace to marry their daughters to English and Dutch seamen, for the time they were to stay in Tonquin, and often presented their sons-in-law pretty handsomely at their departure, especially if they left their wives with child; but adultery was dangerous to the husband, for they are well versed in the art of poisoning."

Europe

Germany

In 1905 the local colonial administration banned civil marriages of "mixed" couples in German South West Africa. Three years later, all "mixed marriages" that had been contracted before 1905 were annulled retrospectively.

During the years which followed World War I, the French Army occupied the Rhineland, utilizing African soldiers amongst their forces. Their children were known as "Rhineland Bastards".

Beginning in 1933, the Nazis declared that the Jews were a group of people who were bound to form a unit by their close, so-called genetic (blood) ties, a unit which a non-Jew could never join or secede from. The Nazis declared that the influence of Jews was detrimental in Germany, in order to justify the discrimination and persecution which they were then subjecting Germany's Jews to. In order to be spared from the discrimination and persecution, a person needed to prove his or her affiliation with the Aryan race, as it was conceived by the Nazis.

It was paradoxical that neither genetic tests nor allegedly outwardly racial features in a person's physiognomy determined his or her racial affiliation, although the Nazis talked a lot about physiognomy, but only the records of the religious affiliations of a person's grandparents decided it. While a person's grandparents had previously been able to choose their religion, in the Nazi era, he or she would compulsorily be categorized as a Jew and persecuted, even if his or her grandparents had originally practiced Judaism but later converted to another religion, thus, if three or four grandparents had been enrolled as members of a Jewish congregation, their grandchildren would be considered Jews and persecuted, regardless of whether they were considered Jews according to the Halachah (roughly meaning: they were Jewish by birth from a Jewish mother or they were Jewish by conversion), apostates, irreligionists or Christians.

The Nuremberg Laws of 1935 forbade marriages between persons who were considered racially superior, so-called Aryans, and persons who were considered racially inferior, so-called non-Aryans; these laws forbade all marriages in which at least one partner was a German citizen. Non-Aryans mostly consisted of Jewish Germans and Gentile Germans who were of Jewish descent. The official definition of "Aryan" classified all non-Jewish Europeans as Aryans, sexual relations between Aryans and non-Aryans now became punishable as Rassenschande (race defilement).

Eventually, children—whenever they were born—within a mixed marriage, as well as children who were born as a result of extramarital mixed relationships before 31 July 1936, were considered Mischlinge or crossbreeds and discriminated against. However, children who were later born to mixed parents, parents who were not yet married when the Nuremberg Laws were passed, were considered Geltungsjuden and discriminated against, even if the parents had gotten married abroad or remained unmarried. Eventually, children who were enrolled in a Jewish congregation were also considered Geltungsjuden and discriminated against.

Geltungsjuden were subjected to varying degrees of forced labour in 1940, an order which was partially imposed on all Jewish-classified spouses, the only Jewish-classified spouses who were exempted from this order were Jewish-classified husbands and Jewish-classified wives who were taking care of their minor children. According to the documents, no mixed couples were ever exempted from persecution, this was especially the case with Jewish-classified spouses.

Systematic deportations of Jewish Germans and Gentile Germans of Jewish descent started on 18 October 1941. In fact, German Jews and German Gentiles of Jewish descent who were living in mixed marriages were mostly spared from deportation. In the event that a mixed marriage ended with the death of the so-called Aryan spouse or the divorce of the Jewish-classified spouse, the Jewish-classified spouse who was residing within Germany was usually deported soon afterward, this was not the case if the couple still had minor children who were not considered Geltungsjuden.

In March 1943, an attempt to deport the Berlin-based Jews and Gentiles of Jewish descent who were living in non-privileged mixed marriages failed due to public protest by their in-laws who were of so-called Aryan kinship (see Rosenstraße protest). Also, the Aryan-classified husbands and the Mischling-classified children (starting at the age of 16) who were born as a result of their mixed marriages were taken for forced labour by the Organisation Todt, starting in the autumn of 1944.

The last attempt, undertaken in February/March 1945, ended because the extermination camps were already liberated. However, 2,600 people were deported to Theresienstadt from all over the Reich, most of them survived the last months of the war and lived to see their liberation.

After the war began, the race defilement law was extended to all foreigners. The Gestapo harshly persecuted sexual relations between Germans and workers from Eastern Europe on the grounds of "risk for the racial integrity of the German nation". A decree dated on 7 December 1942 stated any "unauthorized sexual intercourse" would result in the death penalty. Foreign workers who were brought to Nazi Germany were considered a threat to people of German blood. Polish workers and Eastern Workers who had sexual relations with a German were punished with the death penalty. During the war, hundreds of Polish, Belarusian, Ukrainian and Russian men were executed for their relations with German women.

Atina Grossman in her article in "October" describes how until early 1945, abortions were illegal in Germany (except for medical and eugenic reasons), such as when doctors opened up and started performing abortions on rape victims. It was also typical for women to specify the reasons for their abortions. Many women who wanted to have abortions would claim that they had been raped by men who looked Asian or Mongolian. German women uniformly described the rapists in racialist terms. They never claimed that the rapists were blond, instead, they consistently claimed that the rapists were "of Mongolian or Asiatic type".

With the defeat of Nazi Germany in 1945, the laws which banned so-called mixed marriages were lifted. If couples who had already lived together during the Nazi era had remained unmarried due to the legal restrictions then got married after the war, their date of marriage was legally retroactively backdated if they wished it to be the date when they formed a couple. Even if one spouse was already dead, the marriage could be retroactively recognised. In the West German Federal Republic of Germany 1,823 couples applied for recognition, which was granted in 1,255 cases.

France
During the early 20th century, some Vietnamese men married French women, but most of the time had to hide their relationships through casual sexual encounters, brothels and workplaces. According to official records in 1918, of the Vietnamese men and French women, 250 had married officially and 1363 couples were living together without the approval of the French parental consent and without the approval of French authorities.

Hungary
The Avars, Central Asian nomads who during the late 6th and 7th centuries had formed Avar Khaganate largely inhabited by conquered Slavs, used their wives and daughters as concubines.

The Hungarians are thought to have originated in an ancient Finno-Ugric-speaking population that originally inhabited the forested area between the Volga River and the Ural Mountains. At the time of the Magyar migration in the 10th century, the present-day Hungary was inhabited by Slavs, numbering about 200,000, who were either assimilated or enslaved by the Magyars.

During the Russian campaign in the 13th century, the Mongols drove some 40,000 Cuman families, a nomadic tribe, west of the Carpathian Mountains. The Iranian Jassic people came to Hungary together with the Cumans after they were defeated by the Mongols. Over the centuries they were fully assimilated into the Hungarian population. Rogerius of Apulia, an Italian monk who witnessed and survived the First Mongol invasion of Hungary, pointed out that the Mongols "found pleasure" in humiliating local women.

Starting in 1938, Hungary under Miklós Horthy passed a series of anti-Jewish measures in the emulation of Germany's Nuremberg Laws. The first, promulgated on 29 May 1938, restricted the number of Jews in each commercial enterprise, in the press, among physicians, engineers and lawyers to twenty percent. The second anti-Jewish law (5 May 1939), for the first time, defined Jews racially: people with 2, 3 or 4 Jewish-born grandparents were declared Jewish. Their employment in government at any level was forbidden, they could not be editors at newspapers, their numbers were restricted to six per cent among theater and movie actors, physicians, lawyers, and engineers. Private companies were forbidden to employ more than 12% Jews. 250,000 Hungarian Jews lost their income. Most of them lost their right to vote as well: before the second Jewish law, about 31% of the Jewish population of Borsod county (Miskolc excluded), 2496 people had this right. At the next elections, less than a month after this new anti-Jewish legislation, only 38 privileged Jews could vote.

Southwestern Europe

In ancient history, the Iberian Peninsula was frequently invaded by foreigners who intermarried with the native population. One of the earliest foreign groups to arrive in the region were the Indo-European Celts who intermarried with the pre-Indo-European Iberians in prehistoric Iberia creating Celtiberians. They were later followed by the Semitic Phoenicians and Carthaginians and the Indo-European Romans who intermarried with the pre-Roman peoples of the Iberian Peninsula during Classical Antiquity.

They were in turn followed by the Germanic Visigoths, Suebi and Vandals and the Iranian Sarmatians and Alans who also intermarried with the local population in Hispania during late Antiquity. In the 6th century, the region of Spania was reconquered by the Byzantine Empire (Eastern Roman Empire), when Byzantine Greeks also settled there, before the region was lost again to the Visigothic Kingdom less than a century later.

The offspring of marriages between Arabs and non-Arabs in Iberia (Berbers or local Iberians) were known as Muladi or Muwallad, an Arabic term still used in the modern Arab world to refer to people with Arab fathers and non-Arab mothers. Some sources consider this term the origin for the Spanish word Mulatto. However, the Real Academia Española does not endorse such etymology. This is because the term was mainly used during the time period of al-Andalus to refer to local Iberians (Christians and pagans) who converted to Islam or whose ancestors had converted. An example is the Banu Qasi, a Muslim dynasty of Basque origin. In addition, many Muladi were also descended from Saqaliba (Slavic) slaves taken from Eastern Europe via the Arab slave trade. Collectively, Christian Europeans named all the Muslims of Iberia, "Moors", regardless of ethnic origin.

After the Reconquista, which was completed in 1492, most of the Moors were forced to either flee to Islamic territories or convert to Christianity. The ones who converted to Christianity were known as Moriscos, and they were often persecuted by the Spanish Inquisition as suspects of heresy on the basis of the Limpieza de sangre ("Cleanliness of blood") doctrine, under which anti-miscegenation laws were implemented in the Iberian Peninsula.

Anyone whose ancestors had miscegenated with the Moors or Jews were suspected of secretly practicing Islam or Judaism, so were often particularly monitored by the Inquisition. The claim to universal hidalguía (lowest nobility) of the Basques was justified by erudites like Manuel de Larramendi (1690–1766) because the Arab invasion had not reached the Basque territories, so it was believed that Basques had maintained their original purity, while the rest of Spain was suspect of miscegenation. Hidalguía helped many Basques to official positions in the administration. In December 2008, a genetic study of the current population of the Iberian Peninsula, published in the American Journal of Human Genetics, estimated that about 10% have North African ancestors and 20% have Sephardi Jews as ancestors. Since there is no direct link between genetic makeup and religious affiliation, however, it is difficult to draw direct conclusions between their findings and forced or voluntary conversion. Nevertheless, the Sephardic result is in contradiction or not replicated in all the body of genetic studies done in Iberia and has been later questioned by the authors themselves and by Stephen Oppenheimer who estimates that much earlier migrations, 5000 to 10,000 years ago from the Eastern Mediterranean might also have accounted for the Sephardic estimates: "They are really assuming that they are looking at his migration of Jewish immigrants, but the same lineages could have been introduced in the Neolithic". The rest of genetic studies done in Spain estimate the North African contribution ranging from 2.5/3.4% to 7.7%.

Italy

As was the case in other areas occupied by Muslims, it was acceptable in Islamic marital law for a Muslim male to marry Christian and Jewish females in southern Italy when under Islamic rule – namely, the Emirate of Sicily between the 9th and 11th centuries; and, of least importance, the short-lived Emirate of Bari between 847 and 871. In this case, most intermarriages were between Arab and Berber males from North Africa and the local Greek, Roman and Italian females. Such intermarriages were particularly common in the Emirate of Sicily, where one writer visiting the place in the 970s expressed shock at how common it was in rural areas. After the Norman conquest of southern Italy, all Muslim citizens (whether foreign, native or mixed) of the Kingdom of Sicily were known as "Moors". After a brief period when the Arab-Norman culture had flourished under the reign of Roger II of Sicily, later rulers forced the Moors to either convert to Christianity or be expelled from the kingdom to Muslim settlement of Lucera in 1224 CE/AD.

In Malta, Arabs and Italians from neighbouring Sicily and Calabria intermarried with the local inhabitants, who were descended from Phoenicians, Greeks, Romans and Vandals. There are Maltese people are descended from such unions, and the Maltese language is descended from Siculo-Arabic.

At times, the Italian city-states also played an active role in the Arab slave trade, where Moorish and Italian traders occasionally exchanged slaves.

During World War II, France's Moroccan troops known as Goumiers committed war rapes in Italy, especially after the Battle of Monte Cassino, and also in smaller numbers in France and Germany. In Italy, victims of the mass rape committed after the Battle of Monte Cassino by Goumiers are known as Marocchinate. According to Italian sources, more than 7,000 Italian civilians, including women and children, were raped by Goumiers.

Russia

Already in the 17th century there were many marriages between Russian settlers and aborigines of Siberia.

The Metis Foundation estimates that there are about 40,000 mixed-race Russians.

Many Chinese men, even those who had left wives and children behind in China, married local women in the 1920s, especially those women who had been widowed during the wars and upheavals of the previous decade. Their mixed race children tended to be given Russian forenames; some retained their fathers' Chinese surnames, while others took on Russian surnames, and a large proportion also invented new surnames using their father's entire family name and given name as the new surname.

In 2017, The Moscow Times reported that "Mixed-race marriages are becoming more common in Russia."

Southeastern and Eastern Europe
Vikings explored and eventually settled in territories in Slavic-dominated areas of Eastern Europe. By 950 AD these settlements were largely Slavicized through intermarriage with the local population. Eastern Europe was also an important source for the Arab slave trade at the time, when Saqaliba (Slavic) slaves were taken to the Arab world, where the women and girls often served in harems, some of whom married their Arab masters. When the Mongol Empire annexed much of Eastern Europe in the 13th century, the Mongols also intermarried with the local population and often engaged in war rape and capturing sex slaves during the Mongol invasion of Europe.

United Kingdom

In the late 15th century, the Romani people, who have Indian origins, arrived in Britain. The Romani in Britain intermarried with the local population and became known to the Romani as the Romanichal. In India, employees and officers of the British East India Company, as well as other European soldiers, intermarried with Indian women. Children born in these marriages were called Anglo-Indians. On some occasions, Indian women moved to Britain to live with their husbands. The British East India Company brought many South Asian lascars (maritime auxiliaries employed by British mercantile and shipping companies) to Britain, where many settled down with local white British wives, due to a lack of Asian women in Britain at the time.

Inter-ethnic relationships have become increasingly accepted over the last several decades. As of 2001, 2% of all marriages in Britain are inter-ethnic. Despite having a much lower non-white population (9%), mixed marriages in the United Kingdom are as common as in the United States, although America has many fewer specific definitions of the race (four racial definitions as opposed to the United Kingdom's 86). As of 2005, it is estimated that nearly half of British-born African-Caribbean males, a third of British-born African-Caribbean females, and a fifth of Indian and African males, have white partners. As of 2009, one in 10 children in the UK lives in a mixed-race or mixed-ethnicity family (families headed by one white-British parent and one white parent not of British origin are included in the figure) and two out of five Chinese women have partners of a different race. One out of five Chinese men have partners of a different race. According to the UK 2001 census, black British males were around 50% more likely than black females to marry outside their race. British Chinese women (30%) were twice as likely as their male counterparts (15%) to marry someone from a different ethnic group.

Middle East

A Stanford team found the greatest diversity outside Africa among people living in the wide crescent of land stretching from the eastern shore of the Mediterranean to northern India. Not only was the region among the first colonized by the African migrants, they theorize, but a large number of European and East Asian genes among the population indicates that it has long been a human highway, with large numbers of migrants from both directions conquering, trading and generally reproducing along its entire length. The same team also found out that the Bedouin nomads of the Middle East actually have some similarities to Europeans and South Asians

Inter-ethnic sexual slavery was common during the Arab slave trade throughout the Middle Ages and early modern period, when women and girls bought from warlords in non-Arab lands often ended up as concubines. Most of these slaves came from places such as Sub-Saharan Africa (mainly Zanj), South Asia (Hindus), the North Caucasus (mainly Circassians), Central Asia (mainly Turks), and Central and Eastern Europe (mainly Saqaliba). The Barbary pirates also captured a number of slaves from Western Europe and North America between the 16th and 19th centuries. It was also common for Arab conquerors, traders and explorers to marry local females in the lands they conquered or traded with, in various parts of Africa, Asia (see Asia section) and Europe (see Europe section).

Inter-ethnic relationships were generally accepted in Arabic society and formed a fairly common theme in medieval Arabic literature and Persian literature. For example, the Persian poet Nizami, who had himself married his Kipchak slave girl, wrote The Seven Beauties (1196). Its frame story involves a Persian prince marrying seven foreign princesses, including Byzantine, Chinese, Indian, Khwarezmian, Maghrebian, Slavic and Tartar princesses. Hadith Bayad wa Riyad, a 12th-century Arabic tale from Al-Andalus, was a love story involving an Iberian girl and a Damascene man. The One Thousand and One Nights tale of "The Man of Al-Yaman and His Six Slave-Girls" involves a Yemeni man's relationship with foreign slave girls, four of which are white, black, brown and yellow. Another One Thousand and One Nights tale, "The Ebony Horse", involves the Prince of Persia, Qamar al-Aqmar, rescuing his lover, the Princess of Sana'a, from the Byzantine Emperor who also wishes to marry her.

One study found that some Arabic-speaking populations—Palestinians, Jordanians, Syrians, Iraqis, and Bedouins—have what appears to be substantial mtDNA gene flow from sub-Saharan Africa, amounting to 10–15% of lineages within the past three millennia. In the case of Yemenites, the average is higher at 35%.

A genetic anthropological study known as the Genographic Project has found what is believed to be faint genetic traces left by medieval Crusaders in the Middle East. The team has uncovered a specific DNA signature in Syria, Lebanon, Palestine and Jordan that is probably linked to the 7th and 8th Christian crusades. The Crusaders originated from European kingdoms, mostly France, England and the Holy Roman Empire.

Human trafficking continues today in a smaller form in the Gulf Cooperation Council state, where women and children are trafficked from the post-Soviet states, Eastern Europe, Far East, Africa, South Asia and other parts of the Middle East.

Israel
Among the Jewish population in Israel as of 2014, over 25% of the schoolchildren and over 35% of all newborns are of mixed ancestry of both Ashkenazi and Sephardi/Mizrahi descent, which increases by 0.5% each year. Over 50% of the Jewish population is of at least partial Sephardi/Mizrahi descent.

In Israel, all marriages must be approved by religious authorities, while civil marriages are legally recognized if performed abroad. Rules governing marriage are based on strict religious guidelines of each religion. Under Israeli law, authority over all issues related to Judaism in Israel, including marriage, falls under the Chief Rabbinate of Israel, which is Orthodox. Orthodox Judaism is the only form of Judaism recognized by the state, and marriages performed in Israel by non-Orthodox rabbis are not recognized.

The Rabbinate prohibits marriage in Israel of halakhic Jews (i.e. people born to a Jewish mother or Jewish by conversion), whether they are Orthodox Jews or not, to partners who are non-Jewish or who are of Jewish descent that runs through the paternal line (i.e. not Jewish according to halakha), unless they undergo a formal conversion to Judaism. As a result, in the state of Israel, people of differing religious traditions cannot legally marry someone of another religion and multi-faith couples must leave the country to get married.

The only other option in Israel for the marriage of a halakhic Jew (Orthodox or not) to a non-Jew, or for that matter, a Christian to a non-Christian or Muslim to a non-Muslim, is for one partner to formally convert to the other's religion, be it to Orthodox Judaism, a Christian denomination or a denomination of Islam. As for persons with patrilineal Jewish descent (i.e. not recognized as Jewish according to halakha) who wish to marry a halakhic Jew (i.e., born to a Jewish mother or is Jewish by Orthodox conversion) who is Orthodox or otherwise, is also required to formally convert to Orthodox Judaism or they cannot legally marry.

According to a Haaretz article "Justice Ministry drafts civil marriage law for 'refuseniks 300,000 people, or 150,000 couples, are affected by marriage restrictions based on the partners' disparate religious traditions or non-halakhic Jewish status. A poll in 2014 found that three-quarters of Israeli Jews and two-thirds of Israeli Arabs would not marry someone from a different religion. Inter-faith relationships were opposed by 95 percent of Haredi Jews, 88 percent of traditional and religious Jews and 64 percent of secular Jews.

A group of 35 Jewish men, known as "Fire for Judaism", in Pisgat Ze'ev have started patrolling the town in an effort to stop Jewish women from dating Arab men. The municipality of Petah Tikva has also announced an initiative to prevent interracial relationships, providing a telephone hotline for friends and family to "inform" on Jewish girls who date Arab men as well as psychologists to provide counselling. The town of Kiryat Gat launched a school programme in schools to warn Jewish girls against dating local Bedouin men.

In February 2010 Maariv has reported that the Tel Aviv municipality has instituted an official, government-sponsored "counselling program" to discourage Jewish girls from dating and marrying Arab boys. The Times has also reported on a vigilante parents' group policing the Jerusalem neighborhood of Pisgat Ze'ev to intimidate and discourage local Arab-Jewish couples. The Jewish anti-missionary group Yad L'Achim has also performed paramilitary "rescue operations" of Jewish women from non-Jewish husbands and celebrates the "rescued women" on their website.

In 2014 the marriage of a Muslim groom and a bride who had converted from Judaism to Islam attracted attention when the wedding was protested by Lehava, an organisation opposing Jewish assimilation. An Israeli court allowed the protest to go ahead but ordered protesters to stay at least 200 metres away from the wedding venue in Rishon LeZion. In response, a demonstration in support for the couple was also held.

In 2005 Ben-Zion Gopstein, a disciple of the ultra-nationalist Meir Kahane, founded the anti-miscegenation organisation Lehava. The group's name is an acronym for "To Prevent Assimilation in the Holy Land". In November 2019, Gopstein was indicted on charges of incitement to terrorism, violence and racism.

Turkey

In the 11th century, the Byzantine territory of Anatolia was conquered by the Seljuq Turks, who came from Turkestan in Central Asia. Their Ottoman Turkish descendants went on to annex the Balkans and much of Eastern Europe in the 15th and 16th centuries. Due to Islamic marital law allowing a Muslim male to marry Christian and Jewish females, it was common in the Ottoman Empire for Turkish males to intermarry with European females. For example, various sultans of the Ottoman Dynasty often had Greek (Rûm), Slavic (Saqaliba), Venetian, Northcaucasian and French wives.

In the Ottoman Empire, in addition to the Ottoman elites often taking large numbers of European wives and concubines (see Southeastern and Eastern Europe section), there were also opportunities for the reverse, when the empire recruited young Christian boys (Europeans and Christian Arabs) to become the elite troops of the Turkish Empire, the Janissaries. These Janissaries were stationed throughout the Turkish empire including the Middle-East and North Africa leading to inter-ethnic relationships between European men and women from the Middle East and North Africa.

The concubines of the Ottoman Sultan consisted chiefly of purchased slaves. Because Islamic law forbade Muslims to enslave fellow Muslims, the Sultan's concubines were generally of Christian origin. The mother of a Sultan, though technically a slave, received the extremely powerful title of valide sultan, and at times became effective ruler of the Empire (see Sultanate of women). One notable example was Kösem Sultan, daughter of a Greek Christian priest, who dominated the Ottoman Empire during the early decades of the 17th century. Another notable example was Roxelana, the favourite wife of Suleiman the Magnificent.

Some of these European wives exerted great influence upon the empire as valide sultan ("Mother-Sultan"), some famous examples including Roxelana, a Ukrainian harem slave who later became Suleiman the Magnificent's favourite wife, and Nakşidil Sultan, wife of Abdul Hamid I, who according to the legend may have been Aimée du Buc de Rivéry, cousin of French Empress Josephine. Due to the common occurrence of such intermarriages in the Ottoman Empire, they have had a significant impact on the ethnic makeup of the modern Turkish population in Turkey, which now differs from that of the Turkic population in Central Asia. In addition to intermarriage, the large harems of Ottoman sultans often consisted almost entirely of female concubines who were of Christian European origin. Sultan Ibrahim the Mad, Ottoman ruler from 1640 to 1648, is said to have drowned 280 concubines of his harem in the Bosphorus. At least one of his concubines, Turhan Hatice, Ukrainian girl captured during one of the raids by Tatars and sold into slavery, survived his reign.

Oceania

Australia
Miscegenation was a deliberate policy of the Western Australian Protector of Aborigines, A. O. Neville, who hoped to "breed out" Aboriginal characteristics from the growing "half caste" population of Aborigines in Western Australia.  As a result, he failed to prosecute cases where half caste girls were sexually abused or raped by European Australians, who sought an evening on "the black velvet".  The children of such unions were often taken from their mothers and confined to "concentration camps" at Moore River and Carrolup, as a part of the policy known as Stolen Generations.

The desire to avoid miscegenation was also a factor in the passage and continued enforcement of the White Australia policy. In 1949, Immigration Minister Arthur Calwell stated "I am sure we don't want half-castes running over our country", while justifying the government's decision to refuse entry to Lorenzo Gamboa (a Filipino man and U.S. Army veteran who had an Australian wife and children).

New Zealand
Mixed marriages are very common and almost universally accepted. People who identify as Māori typically have ancestors ('tīpuna') from at least two distinct ethnicities. Historically this lent itself to the belief that "real" Māori were gradually disappearing from New Zealand through mixed marriage. This view held sway in New Zealand until the late 1960s and 1970s, when a revival and re-establishment of Māori culture and tradition coincided with a rejection of the majority opinion.

The belief that Māori were disappearing was partially founded on the reality of high rates of intermarriage between Europeans and Māori since colonisation. During the revival of Māori culture and tradition, this belief was challenged by redefining "Māori" as an ethnic identity as opposed to a racial category. As a result, a person may have one European/Asian/Pacific parent and one Māori parent, but be considered no less "authentically Māori" than a descendant of two Māori.

As of 2010, two-thirds of Māori births, half of Pacific births, and a third of white and Asian births involved more than one ethnic group.

Portuguese colonies

According to Gilberto Freyre, a Brazilian sociologist, interracial marriage was commonplace in the Portuguese colonies, and was even supported by the court as a way to boost low populations and guarantee a successful and cohesive settlement. Thus, settlers often released African slaves to become their wives. The children were guaranteed full Portuguese citizenship, provided the parents were married. Some former Portuguese colonies have large mixed-race populations, for instance, Brazil, Cape Verde, Mozambique, Timor Leste, Macau and São Tomé and Príncipe. In the case of Brazil, the influential "Indianist" novels of José de Alencar (O Guarany, Iracema, and Ubirajara) perhaps went farther than in the other colonies, advocating miscegenation in order to create a truly Brazilian race.

Mixed marriages between Portuguese and locals in former colonies were very common in all Portuguese colonies. Miscegenation was still common in Africa until the independence of the former Portuguese colonies in the mid-1970s. The case for miscegenation in Brazil started in the 1700s when gold was discovered in the heart of the country. This created a spectacular gold rush that lasted nearly 100 years. In this period close to a million men immigrated to Brazil in search of a quick fortune, mostly Portuguese. Since these men had no plans to bring their families, in the process they ended up fathering children with either African slaves or Native American women. Since immigration during this period was overwhelmingly by males, this created a less strict society in terms of enforcing anti-racial laws.

However, Brazil was the last country in the western hemisphere to grant freedom to the slaves, only happening in 1888. When the slaves were freed, the plantation owners encouraged immigration from Europe as a form to replace the slaves. At the beginning of the 20th century, eugenics set foot in Brazil, and although it stated that the white race was superior to the other races, in the end, it somehow contributed to the continuation of the miscegenation of Brazil. With the Politica do Branqueamento (Whitening Policy), the Eugenics encouraged mulatto women (daughter of black and white parents) to marry a white man. According to them, the child would be born much whiter than her mother. A famous painting by Modesto Brocos describes these hopes, showing a black grandmother with her arms to the sky, thanking God for white grandchildren. In the painting, a white man sits at the door, and his wife, a mulatto woman, is holding the child, while the mother is much darker than the daughter.

Demographics of ethnoracial admixture

U.S.
According to the U.S. Census, in 2000 there were 504,119 Asian–white marriages, 287,576 black-white marriages, and 31,271 Asian–black marriages. The black–white marriages increased from 65,000 in 1970 to 403,000 in 2006, and 558,000 in 2010, according to Census Bureau figures.

In the United States, rates of interracial cohabitation are significantly higher than those of marriage. Although only 7 percent of married African American men have Caucasian American wives, 13% of cohabitating African American men have Caucasian American partners. 25% of married Asian American women have Caucasian spouses, but 45% of cohabitating Asian American women are with Caucasian American men. Of cohabiting Asian men, slightly over 37% of Asian men have white female partners over 10% married White American women. Asian American women and Asian American men who live with a white partner, 40 and 27 percent, respectively (Le, 2006b). In 2008, of new marriages including an Asian man, 80% were to an Asian spouse and 14% to a White spouse; of new marriages involving an Asian woman, 61% were to an Asian spouse and 31% to a White spouse. Almost 30% of Asians and Latinos outmarry, with 86.8 and 90% of these, respectively, being to a white person. According to Karyn Langhorne Folan, "although the most recent census available reported that 70% of African American women are single, African American women have the greatest resistance to marrying 'out' of the race."

One survey revealed that 19% of black males had engaged in sexual activity with white women. A Gallup poll on interracial dating in June 2006 found 75% of Americans approving of a white man dating a black woman, and 71% approving of a black man dating a white woman. Among people between the ages of 18 and 29, the poll found that 95% approved of blacks and whites dating, and about 60% said they had dated someone of a different race. 69% of Hispanics, 52% of blacks, and 45% of whites said they have dated someone of another race or ethnic group. In 1980, just 17% of all respondents said they had dated someone from a different racial background.

However, according to a study from the University of California at Berkeley, using data from over 1 million profiles of singles from online dating websites, whites were far more reluctant to date outside their race than non-whites. The study found that over 80% of whites, including whites who stated no racial preference, contacted other whites, whereas about 3% of whites contacted blacks, a result that held for younger and older participants. Only 5% of whites responded to inquiries from blacks. Black participants were ten times more likely to contact whites than whites were to contact blacks, however black participants sent inquiries to other blacks more often than otherwise.

Interracial marriage is still relatively uncommon, despite the increasing rate. In 2010, 15% of new marriages were interracial, and of those only 9% of Whites married outside of their race. However, this takes into account inter ethnic marriages, this meaning it counts white Hispanics marrying non-Hispanic whites as interracial marriages, despite both bride and groom being racially white. Of the 275,000 new interracial marriages in 2010, 43% were white-Hispanic, 14.4% were white-Asian, 11.9% were white-black and the rest were other combinations. However, interracial marriage has become more common over the past decades due to increasing racial diversity, and liberalizing attitudes toward the practice. The number of interracial marriages in the U.S. increased by 65% between 1990 and 2000, and by 20% between 2000 and 2010. "A record 14.6% of all new marriages in the United States in 2008 were between spouses of a different race or ethnicity from one another. ... Rates more than doubled among whites and nearly tripled among blacks between 1980 and 2008. But for both Hispanics and Asians, rates were nearly identical in 2008 and 1980", according to a Pew Research Center analysis of demographic data from the U.S. Census Bureau.

According to studies by Jenifer L. Bratter and Rosalind B. King made publicly available on the Education Resources Information Center, White female-Black male and White female-Asian male marriages are more prone to divorce than White-White pairings. Conversely, unions between White males and non-White females (and between Hispanics and non-Hispanic persons) have similar or lower risks of divorce than White-White marriages, unions between white male-black female last longer than white-white pairings or white-Asian pairings.

Brazil

Multiracial Brazilians make up 42.6% of Brazil's population, 79,782 million people, and they live in all regions of Brazil. Multiracial Brazilians are mainly people of mixed European, African, East Asian (mostly Japanese) and Amerindian ancestry.

Interracial marriages constituted 22.6% of all marriages in 2000. 15.7% of blacks, 24.4% of whites and 27.6% of Pardos (mixed-race/brown) married someone whose race was different from their own.

Genetic admixture

Sexual reproduction between two populations reduces the genetic distance between the populations. During the Age of Discovery which began in the early 15th century, European explorers sailed all across the globe reaching all the major continents. In the process they came into contact with many populations that had been isolated for thousands of years. The Tasmanian Aboriginals were one of the most isolated groups on the planet. Many died from disease and conflict, but a number of their descendants survive today as multiracial people of Tasmanian and European descent. This is an example of how modern migrations may reduce the genetic divergence of the human species, which would usually lead to speciation.

New World demographics were radically changed within a short time following the voyage of Columbus. The colonization of the Americas brought Native Americans into contact with the distant populations of Europe, Africa and Asia. As a result, many countries in the Americas have significant and complex multiracial populations.

Admixture in the United States

Genetic studies indicate that many African-Americans possess varying degrees of European admixture, although it is suggested that the Native American admixture in African-Americans is exaggerated. Some estimates from studies indicated that many of the African-Americans who took part, had European admixture ranging from 25-50% in the Northeast and less than 10% in the South (where a vast majority of the population reside). A 2003 study by Mark D. Shriver of a European-American sample found that the average admixture in the individuals who participated was 0.7% African and 3.2% Native American. However, 70% of the sample had no African admixture. The other 30% had African admixture ranging from 2% to 20% with an average of 2.3%. By extrapolating these figures to the whole population some scholars suggest that up to 74 million European-Americans may have African admixture in the same range (2–20%). Recently J.T. Frudacas, Shriver's partner in DNA Print Genomics, contradicted him stating "Five percent of European Americans exhibit some detectable level of African ancestry."

Within the African-American population, the amount of African admixture is directly correlated with darker skin since less selective pressure against dark skin is applied within the group of "non-passing" individuals. Thus, African-Americans may have a much wider range of African admixture (>0–100%), whereas European-Americans have a lower range (2–20%).

A statistical analysis done in 1958 using historical census data and historical data on immigration and birth rates concluded that 21% of the white population had black ancestors. The growth in the White population could not be attributed to births in the White population and immigration from Europe alone, but had received significant contribution from the African American population as well.
The author states in 1958:

A 2003 study on Y-chromosomes and mtDNA detected no African admixture in the European-Americans who took part in it. The sample included 628 European-American Y-chromosomes and mtDNA from 922 European-Americans According to a genome-wide study by 23andMe, White Americans (European Americans) who participated were: "98.6 percent European, 0.19 percent African and 0.18 percent Native American on average."

In the United States, intermarriage among Filipinos with other races is common. They have the largest number of interracial marriages among Asian immigrant groups, as documented in California. It is also noted that 21.8% of Filipino Americans are of mixed blood, second among Asian Americans, and is the fastest growing.

Admixture in Latin America

Background
Prior to the European conquest of the Americas the demographics of Latin America was naturally 100% American Indian. Today those who identify themselves as Native Americans are small minorities in many countries. For example, the CIA lists Argentina's at 0.9%, Brazil's at 0.4%, and Uruguay's at 0%. However, the range varies widely from country to country in Latin America with some countries having significantly larger Amerindian minorities.

The early conquest of Latin America was primarily carried out by male soldiers and sailors from Spain and Portugal. Since they carried very few European women on their journeys the new settlers married and fathered children with Amerindian women and also with women taken by force from Africa. This process of miscegenation was even encouraged by the Spanish Monarchy and it led to the system of stratification known as the Casta. This system had Europeans (Spaniards and Portuguese) at the top of the hierarchy followed by those of mixed race. Unmixed Blacks and Native Americans were at the bottom. A philosophy of whitening, an example of scientific racism in favor of white supremacy, emerged in which Amerindian and African culture were stigmatized in favor of European values. Many Amerindian languages were lost as mixed race offspring adopted Spanish and Portuguese as their first languages. Only towards the end of the 19th century and beginning of the 20th century did large numbers of Europeans begin to migrate to South America and consequently altering its demographics.

In addition many Africans were shipped to regions all over the Americas and were present in many of the early voyages of the conquistadors. Brazil has the largest population of African descendants outside Africa. Other countries such as Jamaica, Cuba, Puerto Rico, Dominican Republic, Haiti, Venezuela, Colombia, and Ecuador still have sizeable populations identified as Black. However countries such as Argentina do not have a visible African presence today. Census information from the early 19th century shows that people categorized as Black made up to 30% of the population, or around 400,000 people. Though almost completely absent today, their contribution to Argentine culture is significant and include the tango, the milonga and the zamba, words of Bantu origin.

The ideology of whitening encouraged non-whites to seek white or lighter skinned partners. This dilution of non-white admixture would be beneficial to their offspring as they would face less stigmatization and find it easier to assimilate into mainstream society. After successive generations of European gene flow, non-white admixture levels would drop below levels at which skin color or physical appearance is not affected thus allowing individuals to identify as White. In many regions, the native and black populations were simply overwhelmed by a succession of waves of European immigration.

Historians and scientists are thus interested in tracing the fate of Native Americans and Africans from the past to the future. The questions remain about what proportion of these populations simply died out and what proportion still has descendants alive today including those who do not racially identify themselves as their ancestors would have. Admixture testing has thus become a useful objective tool in shedding light on the demographic history of Latin America.

Recent studies

Unlike in the United States, there were no anti-miscegenation policies in Latin America. Though still a racially stratified society there were no significant barriers to gene flow between the three populations. As a result, admixture profiles are a reflection of the colonial populations of Africans, Europeans and Amerindians. The pattern is also sex biased in that the African and Amerindian maternal lines are found in significantly higher proportions than African or Amerindian Y chromosomal lines. This is an indication that the primary mating pattern was that of European males with Amerindian or African females. According to the study more than half the White populations of the Latin American countries studied have some degree of either Native American or African admixture (MtDNA or Y chromosome). In countries such as Chile and Colombia almost the entire white population was shown to have some non-white admixture.

Frank Moya Pons, a Dominican historian documented that Spanish colonists intermarried with Taíno women, and, over time, these mestizo descendants intermarried with Africans, creating a tri-racial Creole culture. 1514 census records reveal that 40% of Spanish men in the colony of Santo Domingo had Taíno wives. A 2002 study conducted in Puerto Rico suggests that over 61% of the population possess Amerindian mtDNA.

Admixture in the Philippines
Historically, admixture has been a common phenomenon in the Philippines. The Philippines were originally settled by Australoid peoples called Negritos which now form the country's aboriginal community. Admixture occurred between this earlier group and the mainstream Malayo-Polynesian population.

There has been Indian migration to and influence in the Philippines since the precolonial era. About 25% of the words in the Tagalog language are Sanskrit terms and about 5% of the country's population possess Indian ancestry from antiquity. There has been a Chinese presence in the Philippines since the 9th century. However, large-scale migrations of Chinese to the Philippines only started during the Spanish colonial era, when the world market was opened to the Philippines. It is estimated that among Filipinos, 10%–20% have some Chinese ancestry and 1.5% are "full-blooded" Chinese.

According to the American anthropologist Dr. H. Otley Beyer, the ancestry of Filipinos is 2% Arab. This dates back to when Arab traders intermarried with the local Malay Filipina female populations during the pre-Spanish history of the Philippines. A recent genetic study by Stanford University indicates that at least 3.6% of the population are European or of part European descent from both Spanish and United States colonization.

Admixture among the Romani people

Genetic evidence has shown that the Romani people ("Gypsies") originated from the Indian subcontinent and mixed with the local populations in Central Asia, the Middle East, and Europe. In the 1990s, it was discovered that Romani populations carried large frequencies of particular Y chromosomes (inherited paternally) that otherwise exist only in populations from South Asia, in addition to fairly significant frequencies of particular mitochondrial DNA (inherited maternally) that is rare outside South Asia.

47.3% of Romani males carry Y chromosomes of haplogroup H-M82 which is rare outside of the Indian subcontinent. Mitochondrial haplogroup M, most common in Indian subjects and rare outside Southern Asia, accounts for nearly 30% of Romani people. A more detailed study of Polish Romani shows this to be of the M5 lineage, which is specific to India. Moreover, a form of the inherited disorder congenital myasthenia is found in Romani subjects. This form of the disorder, caused by the 1267delG mutation, is otherwise only known in subjects of Indian ancestry. This is considered to be the best evidence of the Indian ancestry of the Romanies.

The Romanis have been described as "a conglomerate of genetically isolated founder populations", while a number of common Mendelian disorders among Romanies from all over Europe indicates "a common origin and founder effect". See also this table:

A study from 2001 by Gresham et al. suggests "a limited number of related founders, compatible with a small group of migrants splitting from a distinct caste or tribal group". Also the study pointed out that "genetic drift and different levels and sources of admixture, appear to have played a role in the subsequent differentiation of populations". The same study found that "a single lineage ... found across Romani populations, accounts for almost one-third of Romani males. A similar preservation of a highly resolved male lineage has been reported elsewhere only for Jewish priests". See also the Cohen Modal Haplotype.

A 2004 study by Morar et al. concluded that the Romani are "a founder population of common origins that has subsequently split into multiple socially divergent and geographically dispersed Gypsy groups". The same study revealed that this population "was founded approximately 32–40 generations ago, with secondary and tertiary founder events occurring approximately 16–25 generations ago".

Admixture in South Africa

Coloureds ( or Bruinmense, lit. "Brown people") are a multiracial ethnic group native to Southern Africa who have ancestry from more than one of the various populations inhabiting the region, including Khoisan, Bantu, European, Austronesian, East Asian or South Asian. Because of the combination of ethnicities, different families and individuals within a family may have a variety of different physical features. Coloured was a legally defined racial classification during apartheid.
In the Western Cape, a distinctive Cape Coloured and affiliated Cape Malay culture developed. In other parts of Southern Africa, people classified as Coloured were usually the descendants of individuals from two distinct ethnicities. Genetic studies suggest the group has the highest levels of mixed ancestry in the world. Mitochondrial DNA studies have demonstrated that the maternal lines of the Coloured population are descended mostly from African Khoisan women. This ethnicity shows a gender-biased admixture. While a plurality of male lines have come from Ngunis, Southern African, West African and East African populations, 45.2%, Western European lineages contributed 37.3% to paternal components and South Asian/ Southeast Asian lineages 17.5%.

Coloureds are to be mostly found in the western part of South Africa. In Cape Town, they form 45.4% of the total population, according to the South African National Census of 2011.

See also

 Apartheid
 A Racial Program for the Twentieth Century
 Discrimination based on skin color
 Exogamy
 First interracial kiss on television
 Heterosis
 Interracial marriage
 Interracial marriage in the United States
 Jim Crow laws
 Limpieza de sangre
 List of interracial romance films
 Loving Day
 Lusotropicalism
 Mixed Race Day
 Melungeon
 Multiculturalism
 Multiracialism
 One-drop rule
 Outcrossing
 Plaçage
 Race and genetics
 Race and society
 Race of the future
 Racial antisemitism
 Racial Integrity Act of 1924
 Racial segregation
 Racial segregation in the United States
 Racism
 Racism against Black Americans
 Racism by country
 Racism in the United States

References

Further reading
 
Novkov, Julie, Racial union: law, intimacy, and the White state in Alabama, 1865–1954, University of Michigan Press, 2008, pp. 125–128.

Deschamps, Bénédicte, Le racisme anti-italien aux États-Unis (1880–1940), in Exclure au nom de la race (États-Unis, Irlande, Grande-Bretagne), Michel Prum (Éd.). Paris: Syllepse, 2000. 59–81.
 
 
 

 Jacobson, Matthew Frye, Whiteness of a different color. European Immigrants and the Alchemy of Race, Harvard University Press, 1998.

External links
 
 

Interracial relationships